= Iron-rich sedimentary rocks =

Sedimentary rocks containing 15 wt.% or more iron

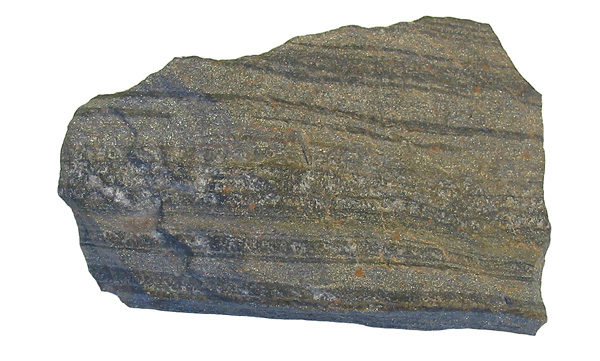
Iron ore from Kryvyi Rih, Ukraine.

Iron-rich sedimentary rocks are sedimentary rocks which contain 15 wt.% or more iron. However, most sedimentary rocks contain iron in varying degrees. The majority of these rocks were deposited during specific geologic time periods: The Precambrian (3800 to 539 million years ago), the early Paleozoic (539 to 419 million years ago), and the middle to late Mesozoic (205 to 66 million years ago). Overall, they make up a very small portion of the total sedimentary record.

Iron-rich sedimentary rocks have economic uses as iron ores. Iron deposits have been located on all major continents with the exception of Antarctica. They are a major source of iron and are mined for commercial use. The main iron ores are from the oxide group consisting of hematite, goethite, and magnetite. The carbonate siderite is also typically mined. A productive belt of iron formations is known as an iron range.

== Classification ==
The accepted classification scheme for iron-rich sedimentary rocks is to divide them into two sections: ironstones and iron formations

=== Ironstones ===
Ironstones consist of 15% iron or more in composition. This is necessary for the rock to even be considered an iron-rich sedimentary rock. Generally, they are from the Phanerozoic which means that they range in age from the present to 540 million years ago. They can contain iron minerals from the following groups: oxides, carbonates, and silicates. Some examples of minerals in iron-rich rocks containing oxides are limonite, hematite, and magnetite. An example of a mineral in iron-rich rock containing carbonates is siderite and an example of minerals in an iron-rich rock containing silicate is chamosite. They are often interbedded with limestones, shales, and fine-grained sandstones. They are typically nonbanded, however they can be very coarsely banded on occasion. They are hard and non-cherty. The components of the rock range in size from sand to mud, but do not contain a lot of silica. They are also more aluminous. They are not laminated and sometimes contain ooids. Ooids can be a distinct characteristic though they are not normally a main component of ironstones. Within ironstones, ooids are made up of iron silicates and/or iron oxides and sometimes occur in alternating laminae. They normally contain fossil debris and sometimes the fossils are partly or entirely replaced by iron minerals. A good example of this is pyritization. They are smaller in size and less likely to be deformed or metamorphosed than iron formations. The term iron ball is occasionally used to describe an ironstone nodule.

=== Iron formations ===
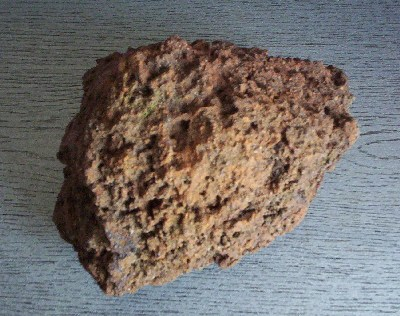
Bog ore from Poland

Iron formations must be at least 15% iron in composition, just like ironstones and all iron-rich sedimentary rocks. However, iron formations are mainly Precambrian in age which means that they are 4600 to 590 million years old. They are much older than ironstones. They tend to be cherty, though chert can not be used as a way to classify iron formations because it is a common component in many types of rocks. They are well banded and the banding can be anywhere from a few millimeters to tens of meters thick. The layers have very distinct banded successions that are made up of iron rich layers that alternate with layers of chert. Iron formations are often associates with dolomite, quartz-rich sandstone, and black shale. They sometimes grade locally into chert or dolomite. They can have many different textures that resemble limestone. Some of these textures are micritic, pelleted, intraclastic, peloidal, oolitic, pisolitic, and stromatolitic. In low-grade iron formations, there are different dominant minerals dependent on the different types of facies. The dominant minerals in the oxide facies are magnetite and hematite. The dominant minerals in the silicate facies are greenalite, minnesotaite, and glauconite. The dominant mineral in the carbonate facies is siderite. The dominant mineral in the sulfide facies is pyrite. Most iron formations are deformed or metamorphosed simply due to their incredibly old age, but they still retain their unique distinctive chemical composition; even at high metamorphic grades. The higher the grade, the more metamorphosed it is. Low grade rocks may only be compacted while high grade rocks often can not be identified. They often contain a mixture of banded iron formations and granular iron formations. Iron formations can be divided into subdivisions known as: banded iron formations (BIFs) and granular iron formations (GIFs).

The above classification scheme is the most commonly used and accepted, though sometimes an older system is used which divides iron-rich sedimentary rocks into three categories: bog iron deposits, ironstones, and iron formations. A bog-iron deposit is iron that formed in a bog or swamp through the process of oxidation.

== Banded iron formations vs. granular iron formations ==
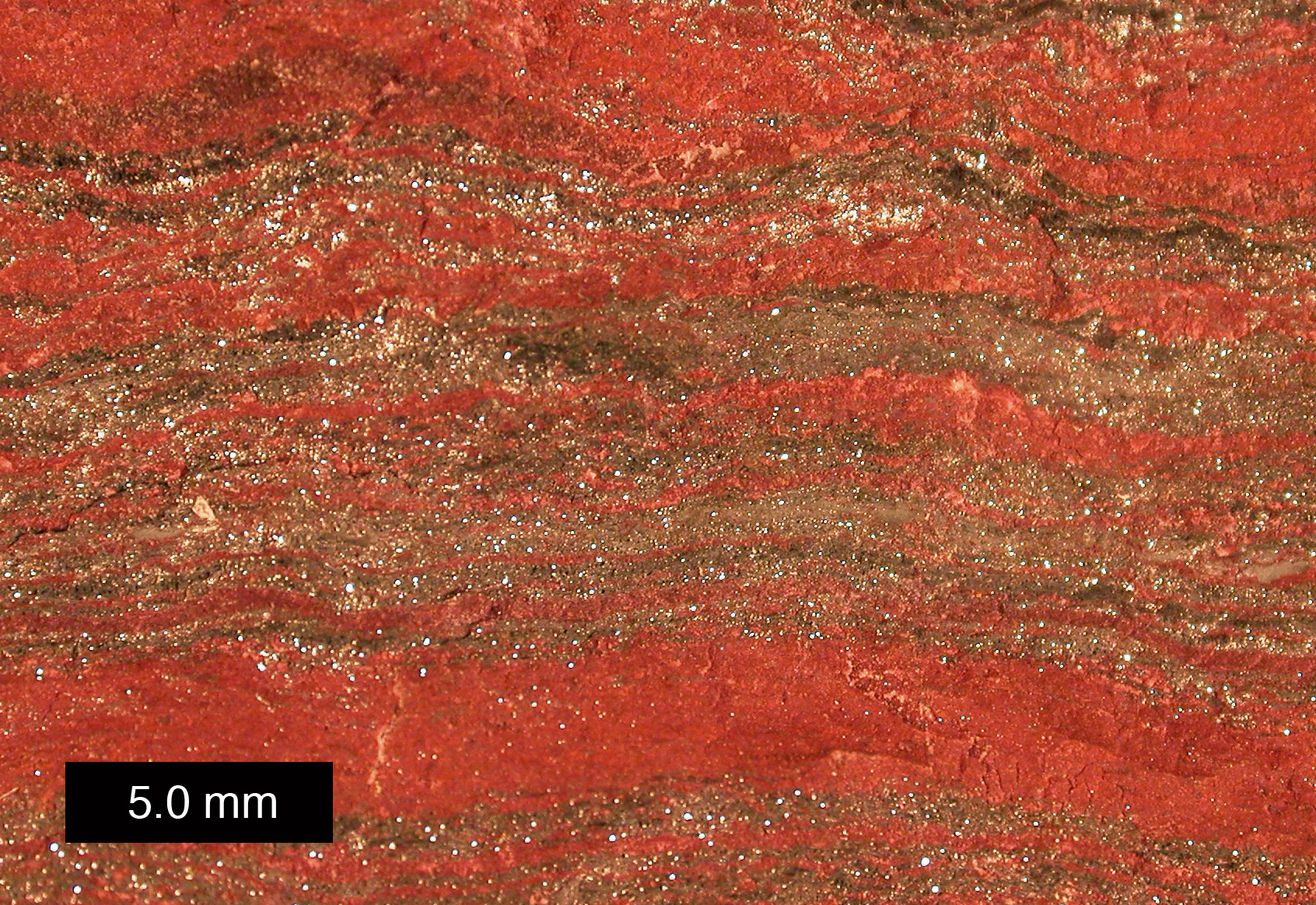
Banded iron formation close up, Upper Michigan.

=== Banded iron formations ===
Banded iron formations (BIFs) were originally chemical muds and contain well developed thin lamination. They are able to have this lamination due to the lack of burrowers in the Precambrian. BIFs show regular alternating layers that are rich in iron and chert that range in thickness from a few millimeters to a few centimeters. The formation can continue uninterrupted for tens to hundreds of meters stratigraphically. These formations can contain sedimentary structures like cross-bedding, graded bedding, load casts, ripple marks, mud cracks, and erosion channels. In comparison to GIFs, BIFs contain a much larger spectrum of iron minerals, have more reduced facies, and are more abundant.

BIFs are divided into type categories based on the characteristics related to the nature of their formation and unique physical and chemical properties. Some categories of banded iron formations are the Rapitan type, the Algoma type, and the Superior type.

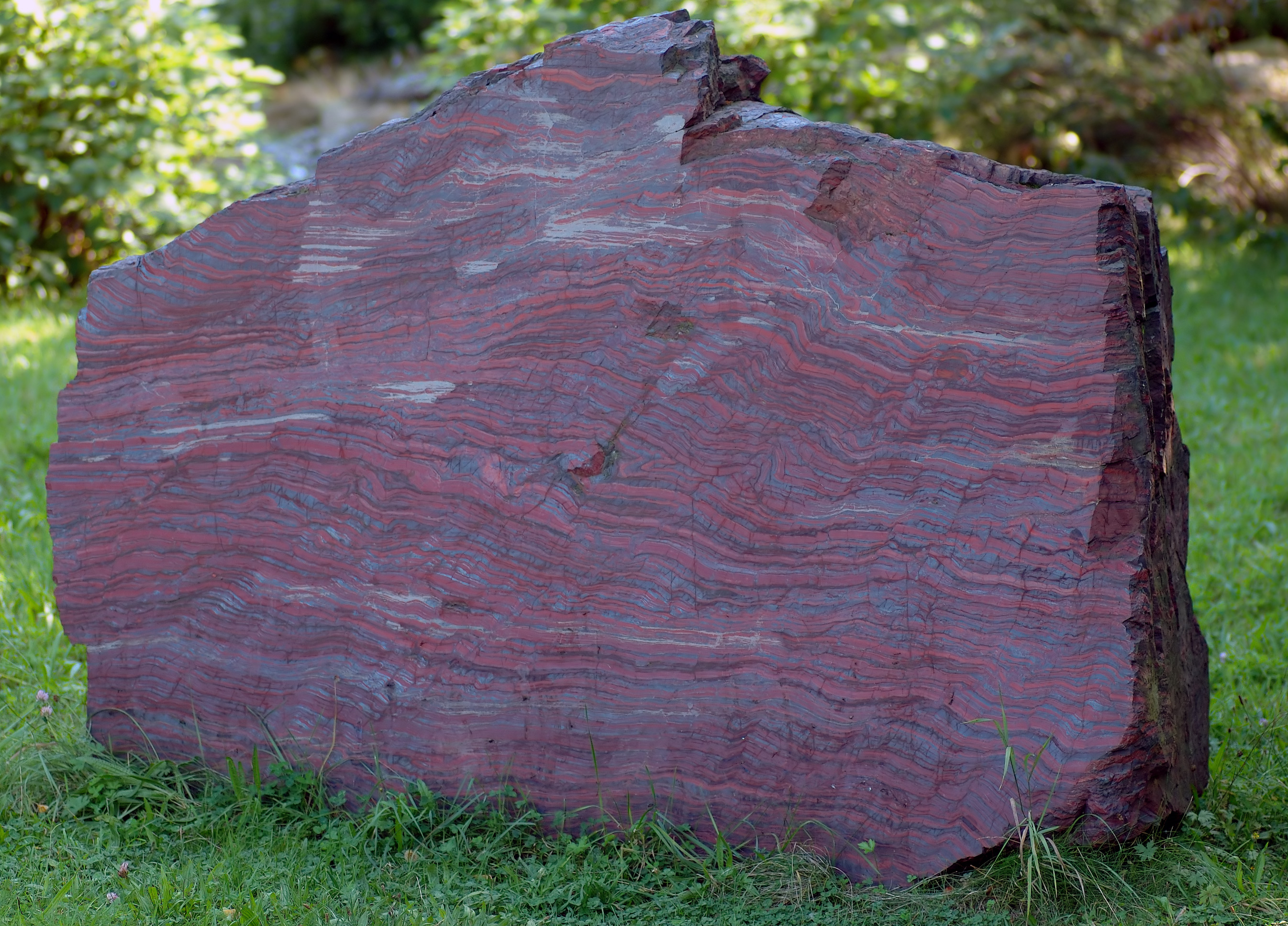
Superior type banded iron formation, North America.

==== Rapitan type ====
Rapitan types are associated with the glaciogenic sequences of the Archean and Early Proterozoic. The type is distinctive as the hydrothermal-input has notably less influence on this formation's Rare Earth Element (REE) chemistry than other formations during this time period.

==== Algoma type ====
Algoma types are small lenticular iron deposits that are associated with volcanic rocks and turbidites. Iron content in this class type rarely exceeds 10^{10} tons. They range in thickness from 10–100 meters. Deposition occurs in island arc/back arc basins and intracratonic rift zones.

==== Superior type ====
Superior types are large, thick, extensive iron deposits across stable shelves and in broad basins. Total iron content in this class type exceeds 10^{13} tons. They can extend to over 10^{5} kilometers^{2}. Deposition occurs in relatively shallow marine conditions under transgressing seas.

=== Granular iron formations ===
Granular iron formations (GIFs) were originally well-sorted chemical sands. They lack even, continuous bedding that takes the form of discontinuous layers. Discontinuous layers likely represent bedforms that were generated by storm waves and currents. Any layers that are thicker than a few meters and are uninterrupted, are rare for GIFs. They contain sand-sized clasts and a finer grained matrix, and generally belong to the oxide or silicate mineral facies.

== Depositional environment ==
Profile illustrating the shelf, slope and rise.

There are four facies types associated with iron-rich sedimentary rocks: oxide-, silicate-, carbonate-, and sulfide-facies. These facies correspond to water depth in a marine environment. Oxide-facies are precipitated under the most oxidizing conditions. Silicate- and carbonate-facies are precipitated under intermediate redox conditions. Sulfide-facies are precipitated under the most reducing conditions. There is a lack of iron-rich sedimentary rocks in shallow waters which leads to the conclusion that the depositional environment ranges from the continental shelf and upper continental slope to the abyssal plain. (The diagram does not have the abyssal plain labeled, but this would be located to the far right of the diagram at the bottom of the ocean).

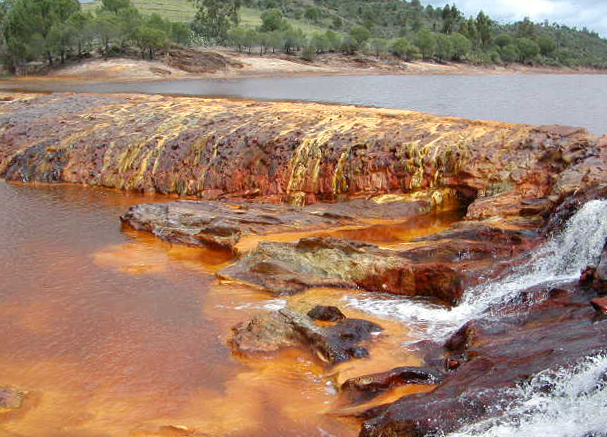
Water colored by oxidized iron, Rio Tinto, Spain.

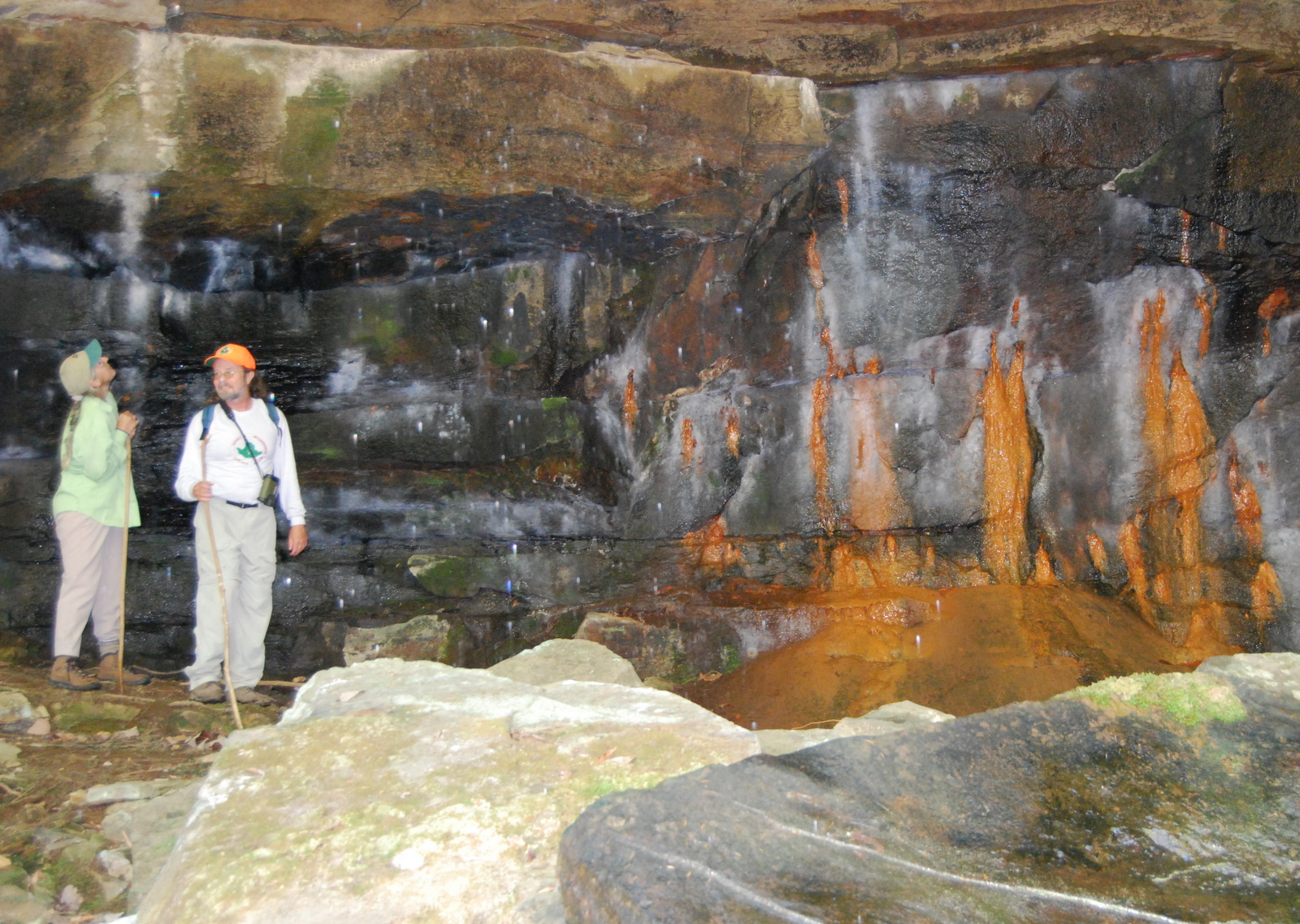
Iron bacteria growing on iron-rich water seeping from a tall bluff, Sipsey Wilderness Area, Bankhead National Forest, Alabama.

== Chemical reactions ==
Ferrous and ferric iron are components in many minerals, especially within sandstones. Fe^{2+} is in clay, carbonates, sulfides, and is even within feldspars in small amounts. Fe^{3+} is in oxides, hydrous, anhydrous, and in glauconites. Commonly, the presence of iron is determined to be within a rock due to certain colorations from oxidation. Oxidation is the loss of electrons from an element. Oxidation can occur from bacteria or by chemical oxidation. This often happens when ferrous ions come into contact with water (due to dissolved oxygen within surface waters) and a water-mineral reaction occurs. The formula for the oxidation/reduction of iron is:

Fe^{2+} ↔ Fe^{3+} + e^{−}

The formula works for oxidation to the right or reduction to the left.

Fe^{2+} is the ferrous form of iron. This form of iron gives up electrons easily and is a mild reducing agent. These compounds are more soluble because they are more mobile. Fe^{3+} is the ferric form of iron. This form of iron is very stable structurally because its valence electron shell is half filled.

=== Laterization ===
Laterization is a soil forming process that occurs in warm and moist climates under broadleaf evergreen forests. Soils formed by laterization tend to be highly weathered with high iron and aluminium oxide content. Goethite is often made from this process and is a major source of iron in sediments. However, once it is deposited it must be dehydrated in order to come to an equilibrium with hematite. The dehydration reaction is:

2 FeO(OH) → Fe_{2}O_{3} + H_{2}O

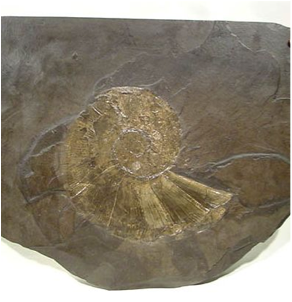
Pyritized Lytoceras.

=== Pyritization ===
Pyritization is discriminatory. It rarely happens to soft tissue organisms and aragonitic fossils are more susceptible to it than calcite fossils. It commonly takes place in marine depositional environments where there is organic material. The process is caused by sulfate reduction which replaces carbonate skeletons (or shells) with pyrite (FeS_{2}). It generally does not preserve detail and the pyrite forms within the structure as many microcrystals. In freshwater environments, siderite will replace carbonate shells instead of pyrite due to the low amounts of sulfate. The amount of pyritization that has taken place within a fossil may sometimes be referred to as degree of pyritization (DOP).

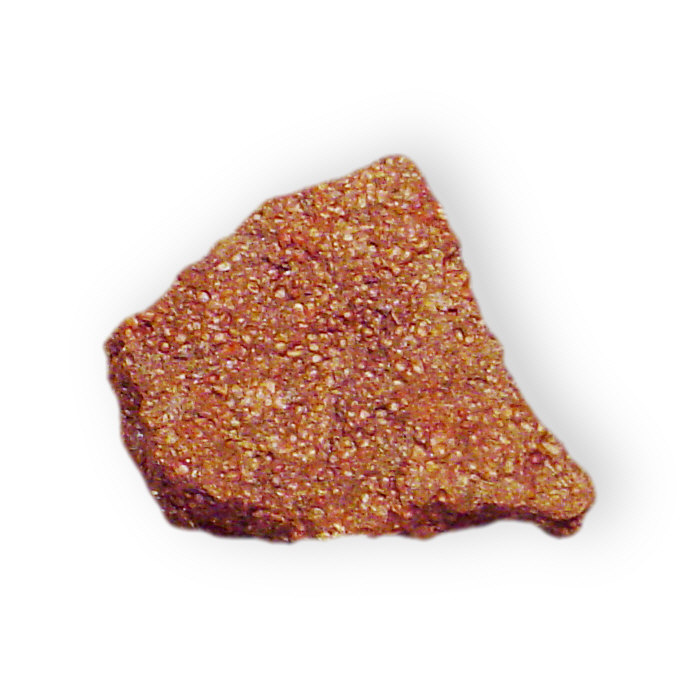
Oolitic Hematite, Clinton, Oneida County, NY.

=== Iron minerals ===
- Ankerite (Ca(Mg,Fe)(CO_{3})_{2}) and siderite (FeCO_{3}) are carbonates and favor alkaline, reducing conditions. They commonly occur as concretions in mudstones and siltstones.
- Pyrite and marcasite (FeS_{2}) are sulfide minerals and favor reducing conditions. They are the most common in fine-grained, dark colored mudstones.
- Hematite (Fe_{2}O_{3}) is usually the pigment in red beds and requires oxidizing conditions.
- Limonite (2Fe_{2}O_{3}·3H_{2}O) is used for unidentified massive hydroxides and oxides of iron.

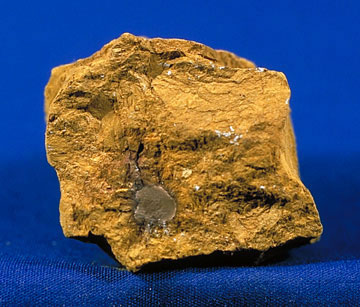
Limonite, USGS.

== Iron–rich rocks in thin section ==
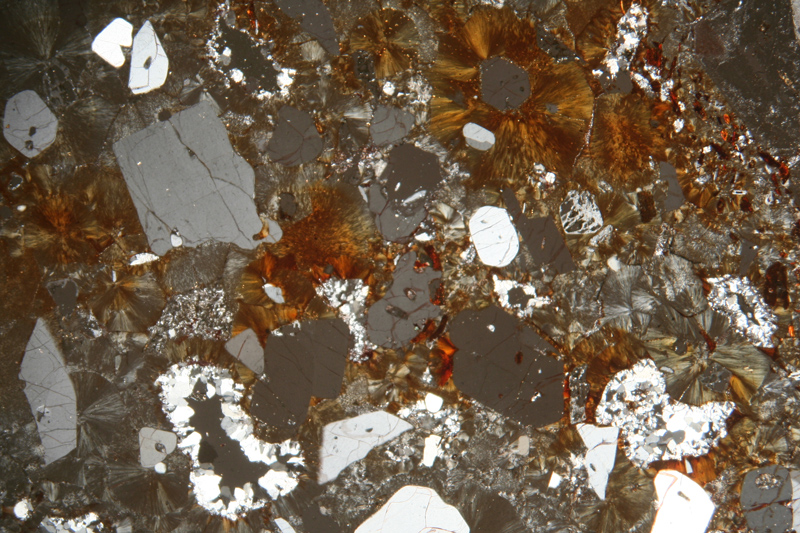
Thin section of rhyolite volcanic rock showing an oxidized iron matrix (orange/brown color).

Magnetite and hematite are opaque under the microscope under transmitted light. Under reflected light, magnetite shows up as metallic and a silver or black color. Hematite will be a more reddish-yellow color. Pyrite is seen as opaque, a yellow-gold color, and metallic. Chamosite is an olive-green color in thin section that readily oxidizes to limonite. When it is partially or fully oxidized to limonite, the green color becomes a yellowish-brown. Limonite is opaque under the microscope as well. Chamosite is an iron silicate and it has a birefringence of almost zero. Siderite is an iron carbonate and it has a very high birefringence. The thin sections often reveal marine fauna within oolitic ironstones. In older samples, the ooids may be squished and have hooked tails on either end due to compaction.
