= Taconite =

Variety of iron-bearing sedimentary rock

- Sedimentary iron formation rock
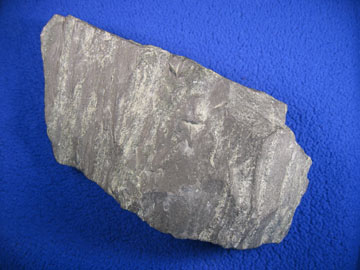

Composition
- Primary: Magnetite, hematite and chert
- Secondary: Siderite, greenalite, minnesotaite and stilpnomelane

Taconite (/ˈtækənaɪt/) is a variety of banded iron formation, an iron-bearing (over 15% iron) sedimentary rock, in which the iron minerals are interlayered with quartz, chert, or carbonate. The name taconyte was coined in the 19th century by Horace Vaughn Winchell – son of Newton Horace Winchell, the Minnesota state geologist – during their pioneering investigations of the Precambrian Biwabik Iron Formation of northeastern Minnesota within the Mesabi Range. He believed the sedimentary rock sequence hosting the iron-formation was correlative with the Taconic orogeny of New England and referred to the unfamiliar and unnamed iron-bearing rock as the "taconic rock" or taconyte. Following development of high grade direct shipping iron ore deposits on the Mesabi Range, containing up to 65% iron and as little as 1.25% silica, miners termed the unaltered iron-formation wall rock taconite.

The iron content is generally 30% to 35%, and the silica content generally around 45%. The iron is commonly present as magnetite, iron silicates, and iron-bearing carbonates, and locally martite (hematite) formed by oxidation of magnetite. Horizons containing magnetite as the dominant mineral have been extensively mined since 1955 to produce iron ore pellets; the term "taconite" has consequently been colloquially adapted to describe the magnetite iron-formation ores (taconite iron ore), the mining, milling, magnetic separation, and agglomerating process (taconite process), and the product iron ore pellets (taconite pellets).

== History ==
In the late 19th and early 20th centuries, the United States was mining such an abundance of iron ore of high quality that taconite was considered an uneconomic waste product. By the end of World War II much of the high-grade iron ore in the United States had been exhausted, so taconite became valued as a source of the metal.

== Production ==
To process taconite, the ore is ground into a fine powder, the magnetite is separated from the gangue by strong magnets, and the powdered iron concentrate is combined with a binder such as bentonite clay and limestone as a flux. As a last step, it is rolled into pellets about 10 millimeters in diameter that contain about 65% iron. The pellets are fired at a very high temperature to harden them and make them durable. This is to ensure that the blast furnace charge remains porous enough to allow heated gas to pass through and react with the pelletized ore. Firing the pellet oxidizes the magnetite (Fe_{3}O_{4}) to hematite (Fe_{2}O_{3}), an exothermic reaction that reduces the cost of pelletizing the concentrate. Edward Wilson Davis of the University of Minnesota Mines Experiment Station is credited with developing the pelletizing process. Since the commercial development of this process in the Lake Superior region in the 1950s, the term "taconite" has been used globally to refer to iron ores amenable to upgrading by similar processes.

Major producers of iron ore pellets from taconite in North America include Iron Ore Company of Canada, Cliffs Natural Resources, Inc., U.S. Steel, and ArcelorMittal. These processed taconite-ore pellets are also referred to as "taconite". Because this is the form that is typically transported by rail and ship, and cargo of these is often discussed, this usage of the term is very common.

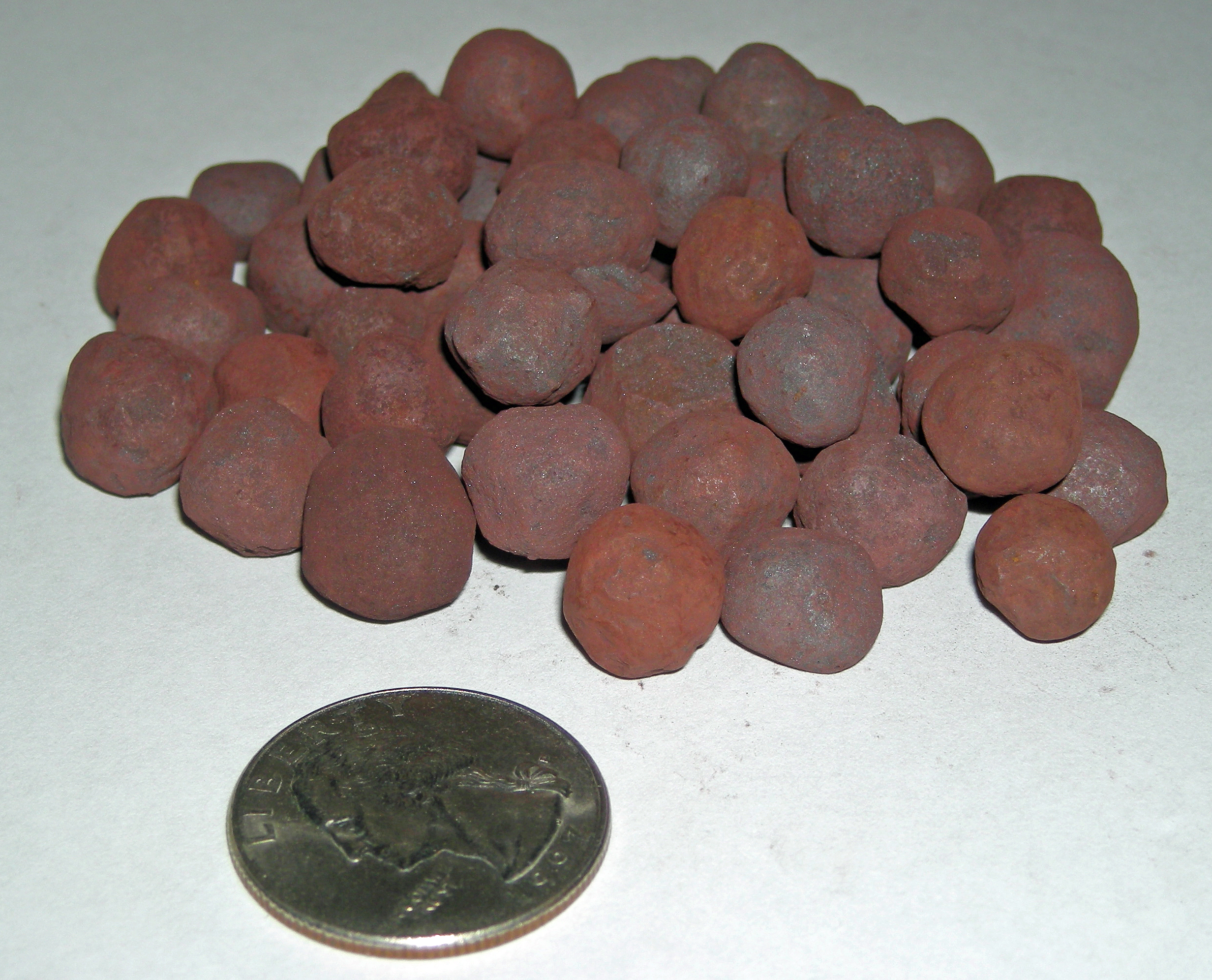
Processed taconite pellets as used in the steelmaking industry, with a US quarter shown for scale.

The Mesabi Range in Minnesota is a major production area. The taconite iron ore pellets are hauled by rail to the ports of Silver Bay and Two Harbors and the Twin Ports of Duluth, Minnesota, and Superior, Wisconsin, all on Lake Superior. The docks at Escanaba, Michigan, on Lake Michigan also ship taconite from the Marquette Iron Range in Michigan, and occasionally ore from Minnesota is hauled by rail there. Marquette, Michigan, also has a taconite dock that loads lake freighters with ore from the Marquette Iron Range. The ore is generally shipped to locations on the lower Great Lakes. Many steelmaking centers are near Lake Erie. Due to increased international demand, taconite is shipped to Mexico and China.

The SS Edmund Fitzgerald, which sank in Lake Superior on November 10, 1975, was carrying about 26,116 long tons of taconite pellets.

== Health ==
Beginning in 1955, Reserve Mining Company discharged crushed waste rock (tailings) from their Silver Bay processing plant into Lake Superior. The tailings contained 40% of the amphibole group mineral series cummingtonite-grunerite, which may form asbestiform particles. A small fraction of the fine-grained tailings were shown to widely disperse along the western shore of Lake Superior, the source of drinking water for numerous cities; for example, tests of Duluth's water supply showed 100 billion fibers per liter of water. There was no epidemiological proof whether these particles caused cancer. In 1974 U.S. District Court Judge Miles Lord ruled that the drinking water and Lake Superior must be protected from the asbestos-like particles. Reserve Mining Company was forced to begin disposing of tailing wastes on the land and to implement air pollution control equipment. This became one of the costliest pollution prevention cases in U.S. history. Government-funded studies have found no adverse health effects from drinking Lake Superior water.

A 2003 study of taconite miners concluded that the most likely cause of 14 of the 17 cases of mesothelioma among miners on the Iron Range was contact with asbestos. Since that study was concluded, 35 more Iron Range miners have been diagnosed with the disease. Mesothelioma occurs at twice the expected rate among the population of the northeastern region of Minnesota, including the Iron Range.

Spurred by the 2003 study, the Minnesota Department of Health studied the relationship of fibrous minerals in taconite and taconite dust, and lung conditions similar to asbestosis, pleural mesothelioma and other pleural conditions which occur following asbestos exposure. Because these conditions can be triggered by industrial asbestos, which was used in taconite mining and processing, as well as other industrial facilities in northeastern Minnesota, the study attempted to determine what, if any, influence naturally occurring fibrous minerals in taconite may have played. The lengthy epidemiological study of Minnesota iron miners concluded in December 2014 that those working 30 years in the iron mines and living to be 80 years old had a lifetime chance of having a mesothelioma of 3.33 cases per thousand such workers, more than double the background rate of 1.44 cases per thousand people living to 80 years old.
