= Bay View Series =

Artwork by Peter Flanary

- Artist: Peter Flanary
- Year: 1993
- Dimensions: 170 cm × 200 cm × 71 cm (68 in × 77 in × 28 in)
- Location: S. Kinnickinnic Ave. and E. Otjen St., Milwaukee; 42°59′51.798″N 87°53′58.728″W

Bay View Series is a public artwork by American artist Peter Flanary located on the Bay View Public Library grounds, which is on the south side of Milwaukee, Wisconsin, United States. Flanary's 1993 Bay View Series consists of three granite rocks and one chunk of taconite iron ore. All have text on them, and the iron ore piece has a hole in the middle. The largest piece measures approximately 68 x 77 x 28 in.

== Description ==
Peter Flanary's artwork outside the Bay View library is made up of four rocks placed around the building. The biggest and most prominent rock is a six-ton irregularly shaped piece of taconite iron ore, which is set into a concrete foundation. The iron ore has a 20 inch hole carved in the center. The other three boulders are granite, and are each placed next to a tree. All of the rocks have words carved into them. The boulder next to the Aspen tree, reads Aspen. The boulder next to the Willow tree, reads Willow. The boulder next to the Catalpa plant, reads Catulpa (sic).

== Historical information ==
The Bay View Series, which cost about $20,000, was created as part of the Milwaukee Arts Board Percent for Art program. The program began in 2000 and requires that 1% of the total budgeted construction for projects exceeding $5000 be applied to public art. The Bay View library fell into this category. Flanary's commission included a work inside the library that consists of three mosaic maps on the linoleum lobby floor. One of the maps represents Bay View at the time of its settlement in 1846. Another map represents Bay View in 1900, the year that a steel mill on the lakefront stimulated the community's growth. The third map shows Bay View as it is today.

The environmental sculpture combines native trees with inscribed boulders outside the library building. One of the boulders comes from the Mesabi Range. Its high iron content relates to the steel mill once located in Bay View. The Bay View Series was dedicated on October 23, 1993 and is currently administered by the City of Milwaukee Library Board.

== Artist ==
Peter Flanary grew up in the Milwaukee area, and currently has a studio in Mineral Point, Wisconsin. He was a part-time lecturer in the art department at the University of Wisconsin-Madison His work frequently incorporates rocks and other environmental objects. His creation process is rarely direct. "He tries to grasp the space in its complexity and wants to create something that can be remarked on by people." "He likes material and form and works to have his piece support and work in its environment, growing out of, rather than intruding into the landscape."

Flanary's work is all over Wisconsin, including three pieces at the Urban Ecology Center in Milwaukee.

== See also ==
- Float
- Walk Like a River
- Environmental art
