= Like a River (disambiguation) =

Like a River is a 1993 album by the Yellowjackets.

"Like a River" can also refer to:

- A song by Carly Simon on her 1994 album Letters Never Sent
- A song by Will Young on his 2015 album 85% Proof

== See also ==
- Like a Flowing River
- Like a River Runs
- Like a River to the Sea (disambiguation)
- Heart Like a River
- Peace Like a River
- Walk Like a River
