= Ironstone =

Sedimentary rock that contains a substantial proportion of iron ore

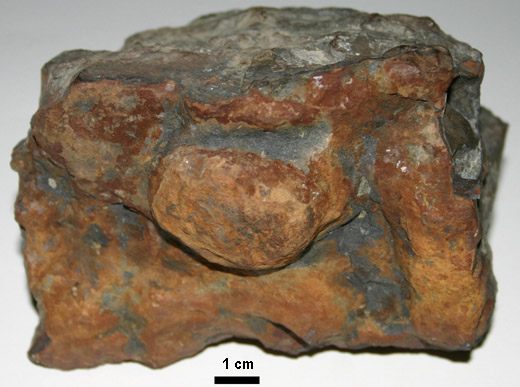
Ironstone (sandstone with iron oxides) from the Mississippian Breathitt Formation, Mile Marker 166, I-64, Kentucky

Ironstone is a sedimentary rock, either deposited directly as a ferruginous sediment or created by chemical replacement, that contains a substantial proportion of an iron ore compound from which iron (Fe) can be smelted commercially.

Not to be confused with native or telluric iron, which is very rare and found in metallic form, the term ironstone is customarily restricted to hard, coarsely banded, non-banded, and non-cherty sedimentary rocks of post-Precambrian age. The Precambrian deposits, which have a different origin, are generally known as banded iron formations. The iron minerals comprising ironstones can consist either of oxides, i.e. limonite, hematite, and magnetite; carbonates, i.e. siderite; silicates, i.e. chamosite; or some combination of these minerals.

== Description ==
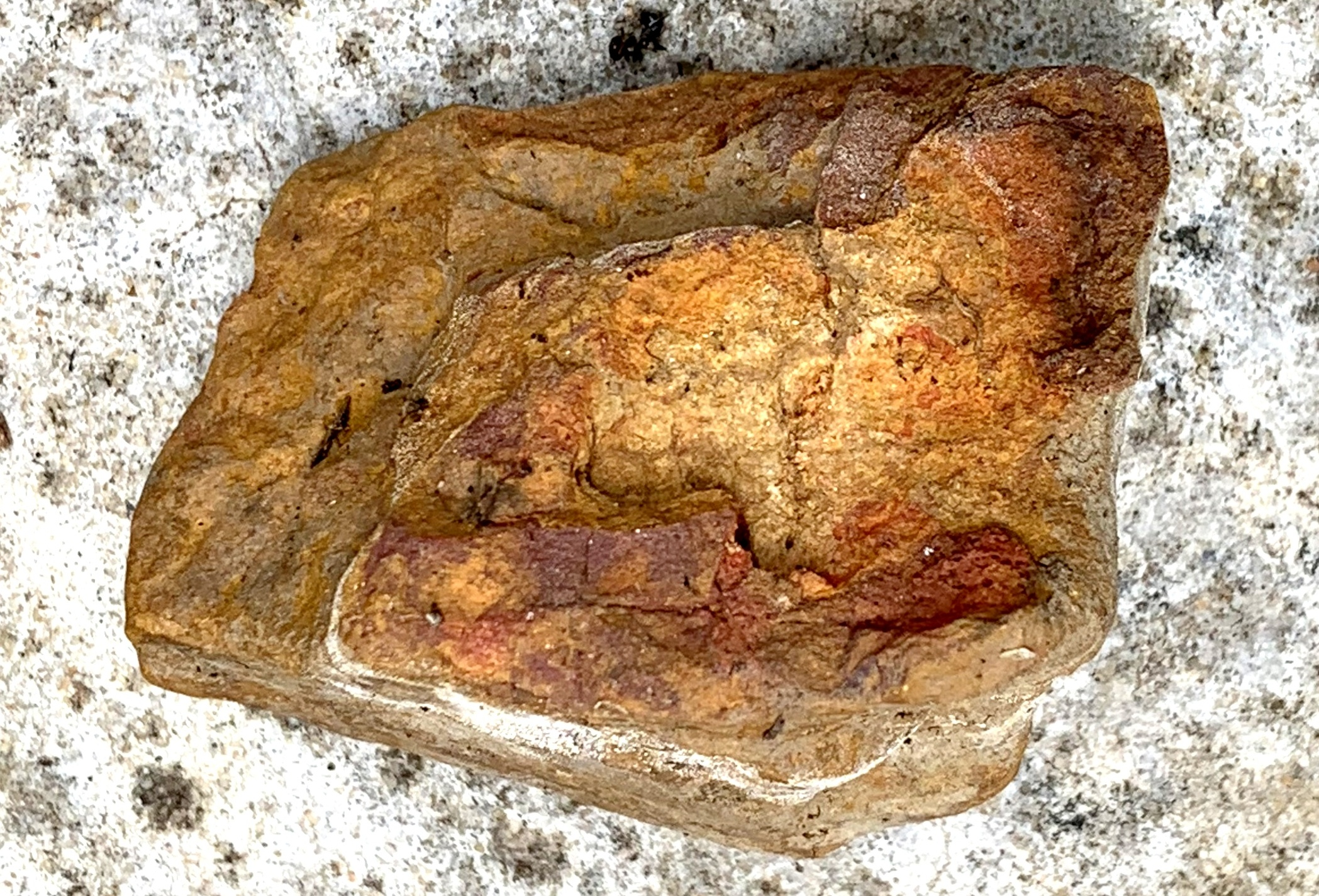
Iron-cemented sandstone from the Late Triassic, Sydney, Australia

Freshly cleaved ironstone is usually grey. The brown external appearance is due to oxidation of its surface. Ironstone, being a sedimentary rock is not always homogeneous, and can be found in a red-and-black banded form called tiger iron, sometimes used for jewelry purposes.

Sometimes ironstone hosts concretions or opal gems.

== Occurrence ==
Ironstone occurs in a variety of forms. The various forms of ironstone include siderite nodules; deeply weathered saprolite, i.e. (laterite); and ooidal ironstone.

== Uses ==
=== Ironstone as a source of iron ===
Ironstone, although widespread, is a limited source of iron. Historically, most British iron originated from ironstone, but it is now rarely used for this purpose because it is far too limited in quantity and of too low a grade (i.e. percentage of iron per tonne mined) to be an economic source of iron ore. Nearly 2/3 of the iron ore smelted comes from banded iron formations.

=== Ceramics ===
Ironstone's oxide impurities render it useless as a component in ceramics: the "ironstone china" of Staffordshire and American manufacture, a fine, white, high-fired vitreous semi-porcelain, commonly used for heavy-duty dinner services in the 19th century, includes no ironstone in its production. Its "iron" quality is in its resistance to chipping.

=== In construction ===
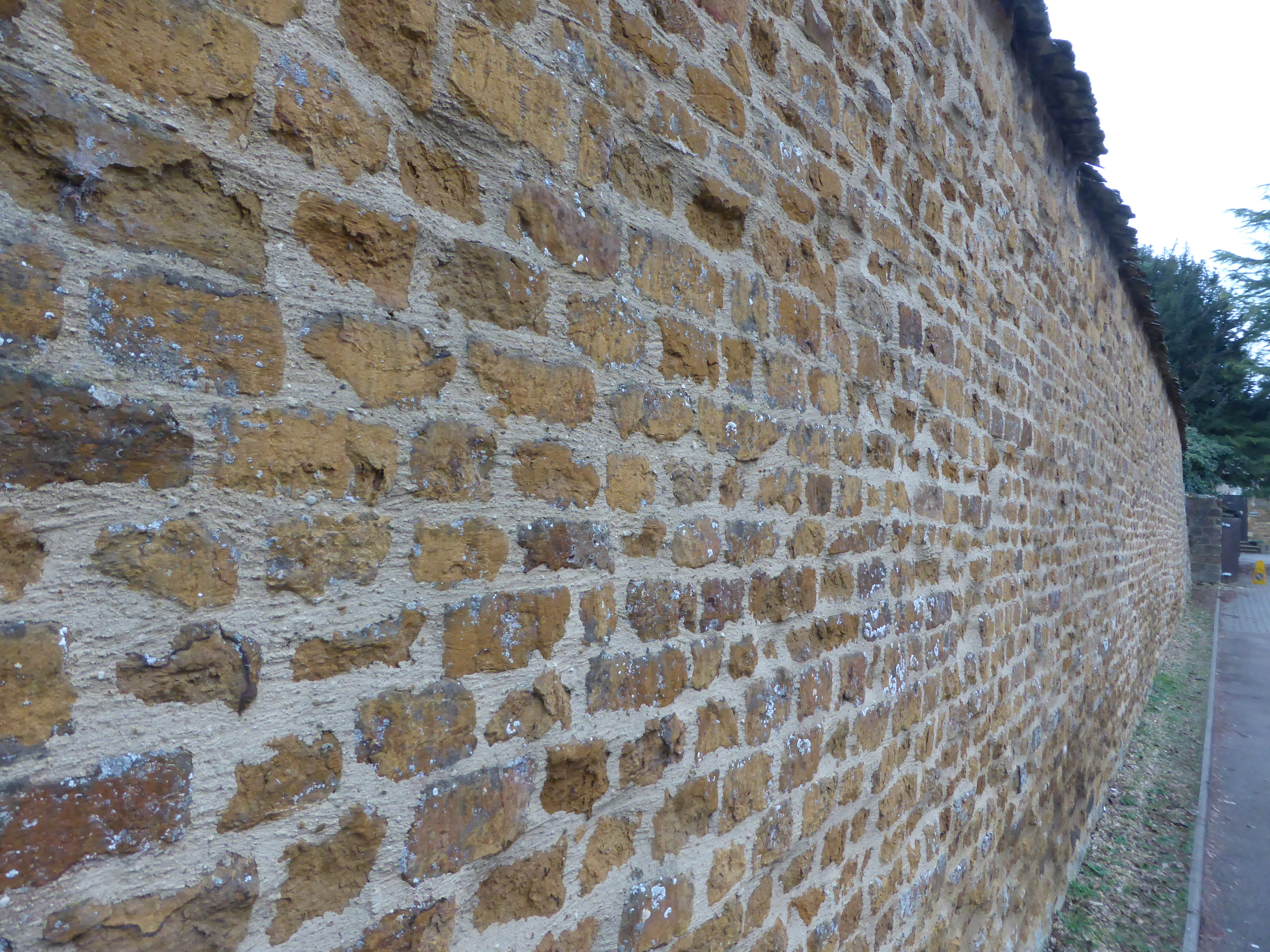
Ironstone wall in Deddington

The stone can be used as a building material. Examples include the parish churches at Kirby Bellars and South Croxton in Leicestershire, and Eydon Hall in Northamptonshire.

=== In art ===
Sculptures carved out of ironstone are rare. One example is Henry Moore's Head created in 1930.

== See also ==
- Iron ore
- Iron-rich sedimentary rocks
- Ironsand
