= Greenalite =

Phyllosilicate mineral in the kaolinite-serpentine group

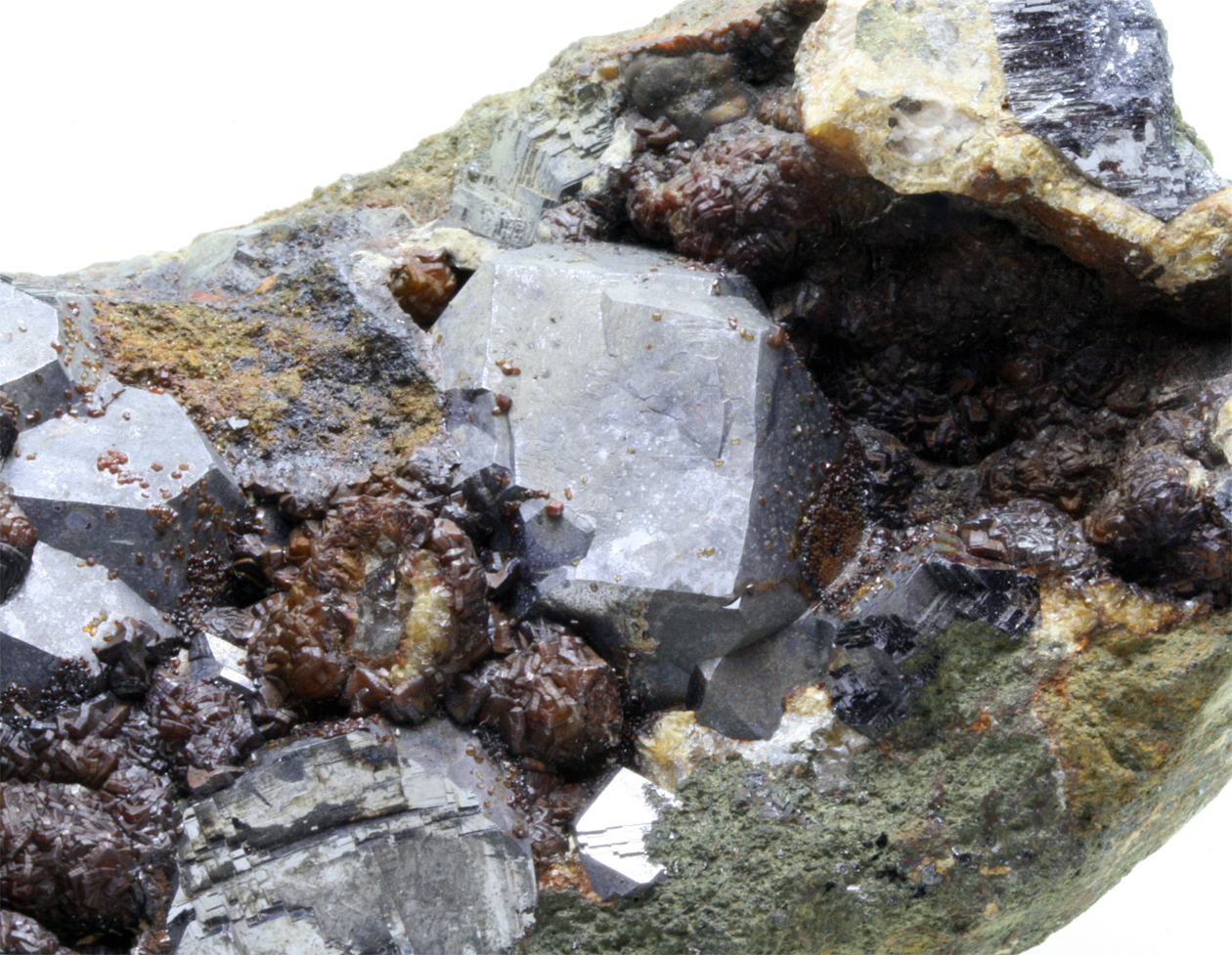
- Greenalite (green) with galena and siderite, from Spain

General
- Category: Phyllosilicate minerals
- Group: Kaolinite-Serpentine group
- Formula: (Fe^{2+},Fe^{3+})_{2-3}Si_{2}O_{5}(OH)_{4}
- IMA symbol: Gre
- Strunz classification: 9.ED.15
- Crystal system: Monoclinic
- Crystal class: Domatic (m) (same H-M symbol)
- Space group: Cm
- Unit cell: a = 5.54, b = 9.55 c = 7.44 [Å]; β = 104.2°; Z = 2

Identification
- Color: Green, light yellow-green
- Crystal habit: Rare minute crystals, rounded grains common; as porphyroblasts, oolites
- Cleavage: None
- Mohs scale hardness: 2.5
- Luster: Dull, earthy
- Streak: Greenish-gray
- Diaphaneity: Translucent to subopaque
- Specific gravity: 2.85 - 3.15
- Optical properties: Biaxial (+)
- Refractive index: n_{α} = 1.650 - 1.675 n_{β} = 1.674 n_{γ} = 1.674
- Birefringence: δ = 0.024
- Pleochroism: X = pale yellow, Y and Z = green
- Other characteristics: Magnetic

Greenalite is a mineral in the kaolinite-serpentine group with the chemical composition (Fe^{2+},Fe^{3+})_{2-3}Si_{2}O_{5}(OH)_{4}.

== Occurrence ==
Greenalite was first described in 1903 for an occurrence in the Mesabi Range near Biwabik, St. Louis County, Minnesota and named for its green color.

Greenalite occurs as a primary mineral in banded iron formations. Rocks which contain greenalite are usually bright green, pale green or pale brown. Greenalite occurs with quartz, stilpnomelane, siderite, chamosite, pyrite and minnesotaite. It is commonly oolitic.

== Effect on early life ==
Greenalite, which is common in Archean rocks, formed rapidly in Archean seawater removing zinc, copper and vanadium in the process. This left the seawater rich in manganese, molybdenum, and cadmium, which are metals favoured by lifeforms at that time. Experiments have shown that the removed metals would have been removed permanently, having a significant effect on early seawater.
