= Edward Wilson Davis =

American engineer and inventor pioneering research in taconite (1888 – 1973)

Edward Wilson Davis (May 8, 1888 – December 3, 1973) was an American engineer and inventor famous for pioneering early research into taconite. As a researcher at the University of Minnesota, Davis developed an engineering process to economically extract iron ore from hard taconite rocks, making taconite valuable as iron ore for the iron and steel industries. He worked closely with industrial firms such as the Mesabi Iron Company and the Reserve Mining Company to transform his research into a working industry on northeast Minnesota's Iron Range. Davis was known as "Mr. Taconite" for his efforts.

== Life and career ==
Davis was born on May 8, 1888, in Cambridge City, Indiana. He pursued courses in science and engineering and received a degree in electrical engineering from Purdue University in 1911. In 1912, Davis began working as a mathematics instructor at the University of Minnesota.

In 1913, Davis began working on taconite. Over the next four decades, Davis devised a process to crush the hard rock, separate the iron from the crushed rock using magnets, and roll the iron into pellets suitable for transport and use in a blast furnace. Davis earned 19 patents for his many innovations. In the 1950s, Davis's research was used to create several taconite processing plants in northeast Minnesota. The Reserve Mining Company honored Davis by naming its Silver Bay, Minnesota, facility the E. W. Davis Works.

In addition to his taconite research, Davis was active in Minnesota politics and history. He published an account of his research, Pioneering With Taconite, with the Minnesota Historical Society in 1964.
