= Walk Like a River =

Public sculpture in Milwaukee, Wisconsin, United States

- Artist: Peter Flanary
- Year: 2006
- Type: bronze and granite
- Location: Riverside Park; Milwaukee, Wisconsin; 43°4′7.092″N 87°53′22.464″W
- Owner: Urban Ecology Center

Walk Like a River is a public sculpture by Peter Flanary located at Riverside Park on the east side of Milwaukee, Wisconsin. Walk Like a River consists of three sculptures--Drop, Gather, and Flow—installed throughout the park. The group of sculptures was commissioned by the Urban Ecology Center, a nonprofit organization.

== Description ==
The elements of Walk Like a River are made of open bronze cages filled with fist-sized glacial stones in a variety of natural shapes and colors. Drop is one large round form, Gather is five round forms of varying sizes stacked together, and Flow is shaped like a wave or squiggle with squared-off ends.

== Historical information ==
The works are arrayed throughout the neighborhood portion of Riverside Park, creating a path between N. Oakland Avenue and the Urban Ecology Center. According to the Riverwest Currents, the Urban Ecology Center's goal was to install artwork that would create a pathway to its new building in the southwest corner of Riverside Park. The Milwaukee Arts Board, Murph Burke, and Mary L. Nohl Fund of the Greater Milwaukee Foundation contributed financial support to the project.

== Artist ==
Peter Flanary grew up in the Milwaukee area, and currently has a studio in Mineral Point, Wisconsin. He was a part-time lecturer in the art department at the University of Wisconsin-Madison

== See also ==
- Bay View Series
- Float
- Environmental art
