= Minnesotaite =

Phyllosilicate mineral in the pyrophyllite-talc group

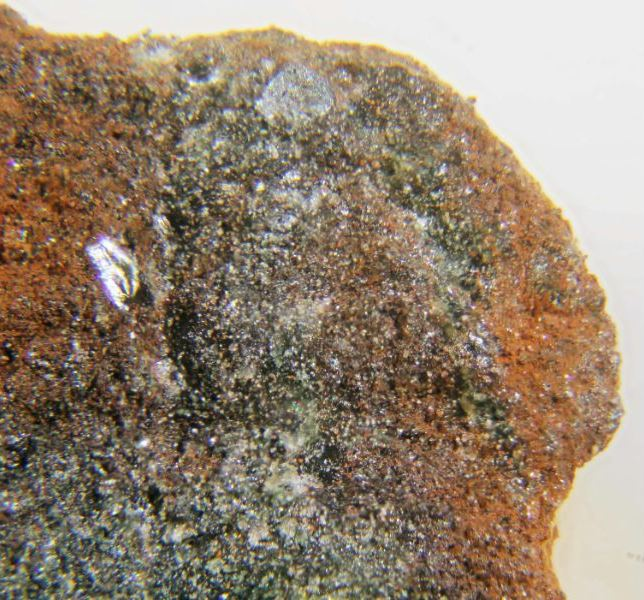
- Minnesotaite

General
- Category: Phyllosilicate minerals
- Group: Pyrophyllite-Talc group
- Formula: (Fe^{2+},Mg)_{3}Si_{4}O_{10}(OH)_{2}
- IMA symbol: Mns
- Strunz classification: 9.EC.05
- Crystal system: Triclinic
- Crystal class: Pinacoidal (1̅) (same H-M symbol)
- Space group: P1̅
- Unit cell: a = 5.623(2) Å, b = 9.419(2) Å, c = 9.624(3) Å; α = 85.21(3)°, β = 95.64(3)°, γ = 90.00°; Z = 2

Identification
- Color: Greenish gray to olive-green
- Crystal habit: Occurs as microscopic needles or platelets, the needles occur in radiating clusters or in sheaves; also fibrous
- Twinning: Inferred based on X-ray patterns
- Cleavage: Perfect on {001}, micaceous
- Fracture: Uneven and irregular
- Tenacity: Brittle
- Mohs scale hardness: 1.5 - 2
- Luster: Greasy to waxy, dull
- Diaphaneity: Translucent
- Specific gravity: 3.01
- Optical properties: Biaxial (-)
- Refractive index: n_{α} = 1.578 - 1.583 n_{β} = 1.578 - 1.622 n_{γ} = 1.615 - 1.623
- Birefringence: δ = 0.037 - 0.040
- Pleochroism: X= pale green, Z= colorless to pale greenish yellow
- 2V angle: Measured: 4°
- Dispersion: r < v moderate

Minnesotaite is an iron silicate mineral with formula: (Fe^{2+},Mg)_{3}Si_{4}O_{10}(OH)_{2}. It crystallizes in the triclinic crystal system and occurs as fine needles and platelets with other silicates. It is isostructural with the pyrophyllite-talc mineral group.

== Occurrence ==
Minnesotaite was first described in 1944 for occurrences in the banded iron formations of northern Minnesota for which it was named. Co-type localities are in the Cuyuna North Range, Crow Wing County and the Mesabi Range in St. Louis County.

It occurs associated with quartz, siderite, stilpnomelane, greenalite and magnetite. In addition to the low grade metamorphic banded iron formations it has also been reported as an alteration mineral associated with sulfide bearing veins.
