= Like a River to the Sea =

Like a River to the Sea may refer to:

- "Like a River to the Sea", a 1993 song by the American country musician Steve Wariner
- Like a River to the Sea, a 2015 album by the British musician Jahnavi Harrison
