= Banded iron formation =

Layered iron-rich sedimentary rock

- Sedimentary rock
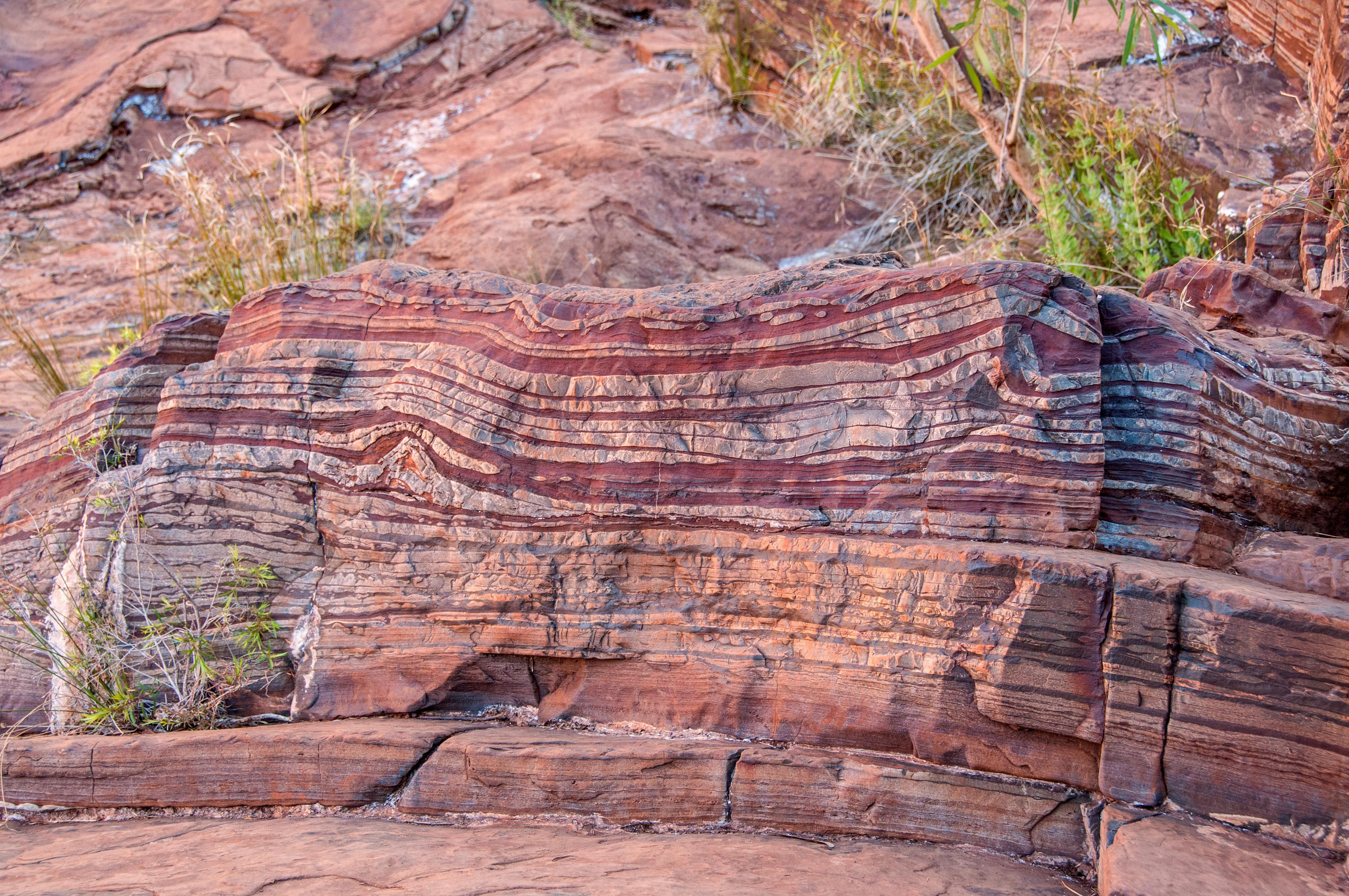
- Banded iron formation, Karijini National Park, Western Australia

Composition
- Primary: iron oxides, cherts
- Secondary: Other

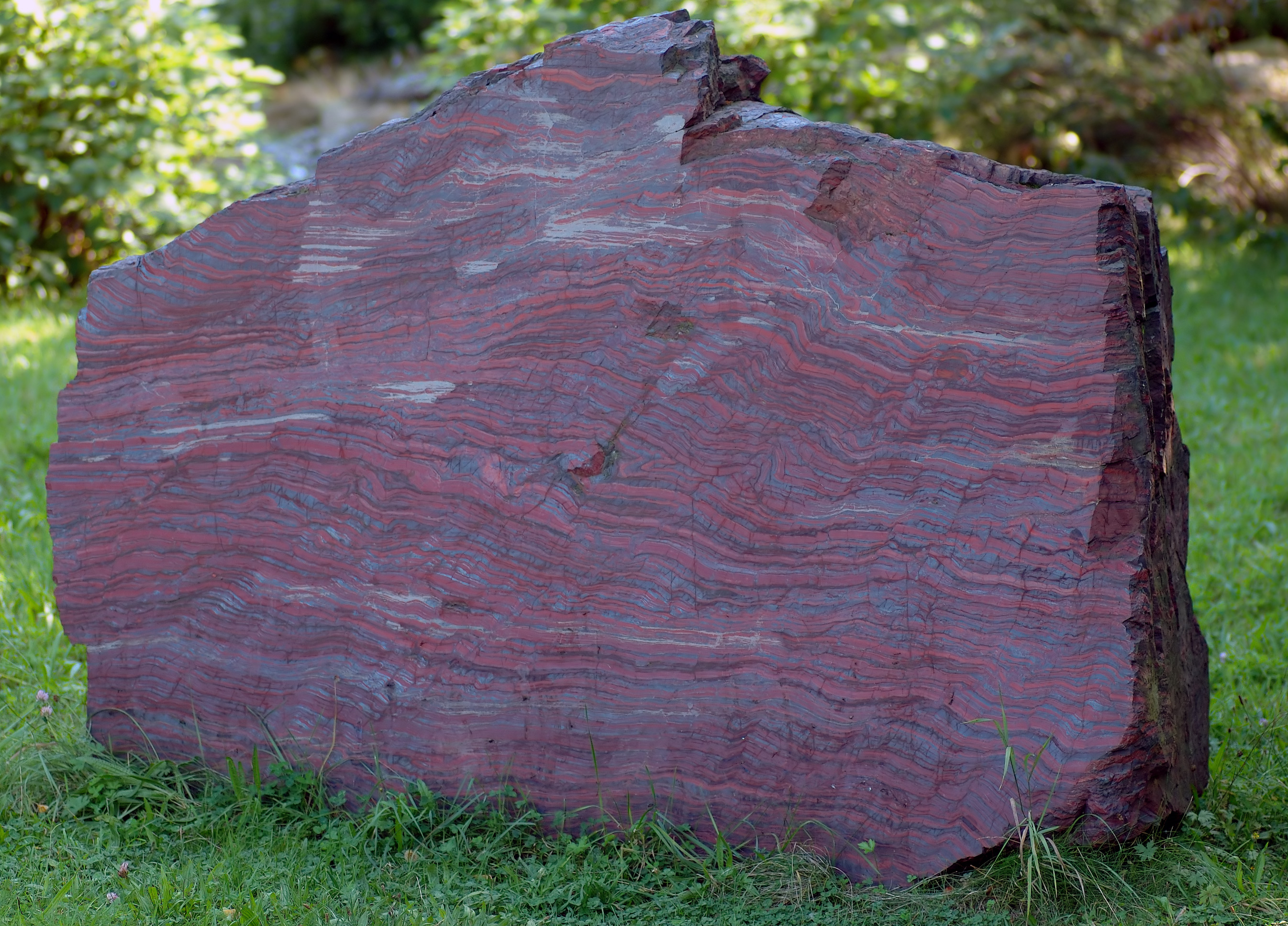
2.1 billion year old rock from North America showing banded iron formation, displayed in Dresden, Saxony, Germany

Banded iron formations (BIFs; also called banded ironstone formations) are distinctive units of sedimentary rock consisting of alternating layers of iron oxides and iron-poor chert. They can be up to several hundred meters in thickness and extend laterally for several hundred kilometers. Almost all of these formations are of Precambrian age and are theorized to record the oxygenation of the Earth's oceans. Some of the Earth's oldest rock formations, which formed about 3,700 million years ago (Ma), are associated with banded iron formations.

Banded iron formations are theorized to have formed in sea water as the result of oxygen production by photosynthetic cyanobacteria. The oxygen combined with dissolved iron in Earth's oceans to form insoluble iron oxides, which precipitated out, forming a thin layer on the ocean floor. Each band is similar to a varve, resulting from cyclic variations in oxygen production.

Banded iron formations were first discovered in northern Michigan in 1844. Banded iron formations account for more than 60% of global iron reserves and provide most of the iron ore presently mined. Most formations can be found in Australia, Brazil, Canada, India, Russia, South Africa, Ukraine, and the United States.

== Description ==
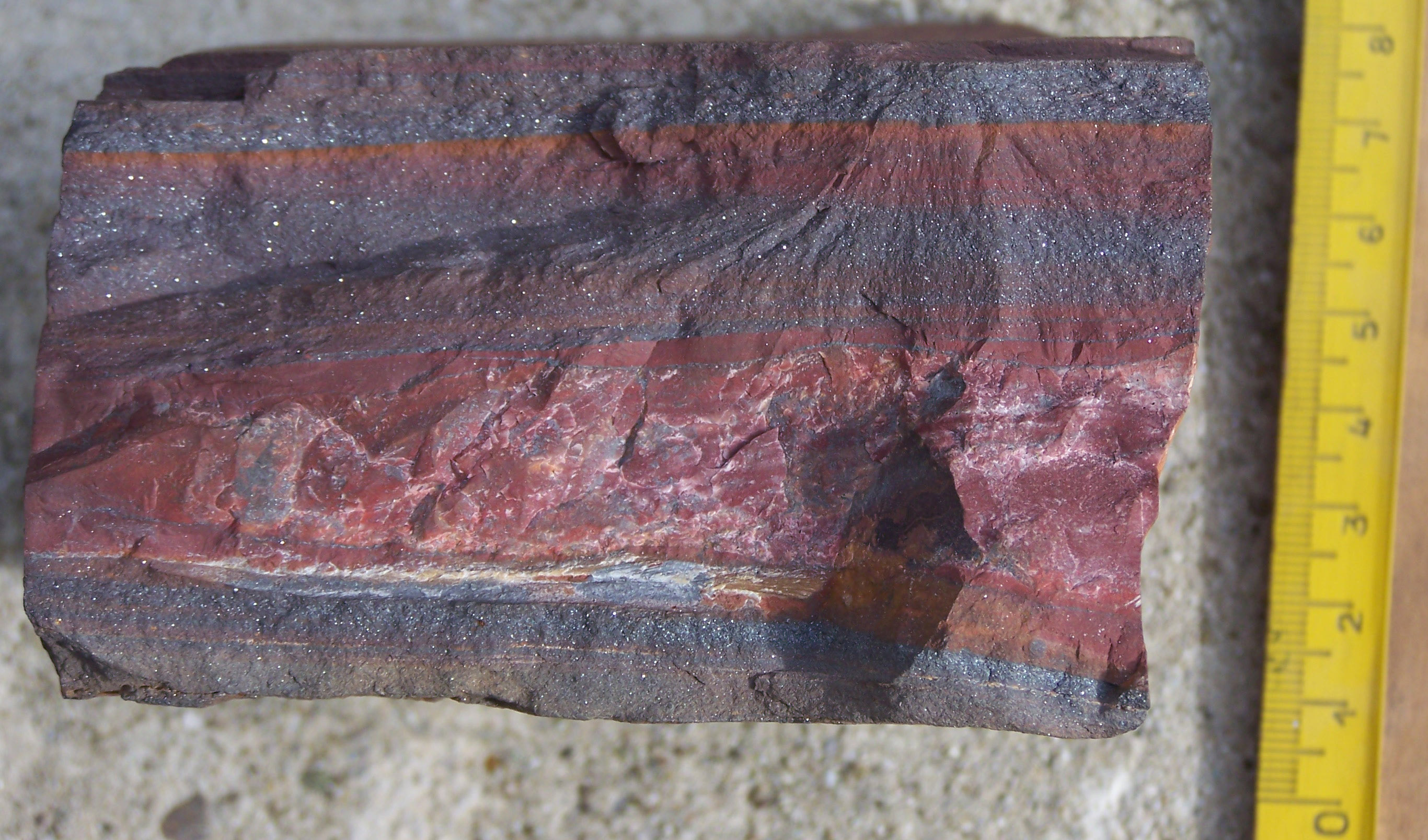
Banded iron formation from the Barberton Greenstone Belt, South Africa

A typical banded iron formation consists of repeated, thin layers (a few millimeters to a few centimeters in thickness) of silver to black iron oxides, either magnetite (Fe_{3}O_{4}) or hematite (Fe_{2}O_{3}), alternating with bands of iron-poor chert, often red in color, of similar thickness. A single banded iron formation can be up to several hundred meters in thickness and extend laterally for several hundred kilometers.

Banded iron formation is more precisely defined as chemically precipitated sedimentary rock containing greater than 15% iron. However, most BIFs have a higher content of iron, typically around 30% by mass, so that roughly half the rock is iron oxides and the other half is silica. The iron in BIFs is divided roughly equally between the more oxidized ferric form, Fe(III), and the more reduced ferrous form, Fe(II), so that the ratio Fe(III)/Fe(II+III) typically varies from 0.3 to 0.6. This indicates a predominance of magnetite, in which the ratio is 0.67, over hematite, for which the ratio is 1. In addition to the iron oxides (hematite and magnetite), the iron sediment may contain the iron-rich carbonates siderite and ankerite, or the iron-rich silicates minnesotaite and greenalite. Most BIFs are chemically simple, containing little but iron oxides, silica, and minor carbonate, though some contain significant calcium and magnesium, up to 9% and 6.7% as oxides respectively.

When used in the singular, the term banded iron formation refers to the sedimentary lithology just described. The plural form, banded iron formations, is used informally to refer to stratigraphic units that consist primarily of banded iron formation.

A well-preserved banded iron formation typically consists of macrobands several meters thick that are separated by thin shale beds. The macrobands in turn are composed of characteristic alternating layers of chert and iron oxides, called mesobands, that are several millimeters to a few centimeters thick. Many of the chert mesobands contain microbands of iron oxides that are less than a millimeter thick, while the iron mesobands are relatively featureless. BIFs tend to be extremely hard, tough, and dense, making them highly resistant to erosion, and they show fine details of stratification over great distances, suggesting they were deposited in a very low-energy environment; that is, in relatively deep water, undisturbed by wave motion or currents. BIFs only rarely interfinger with other rock types, tending to form sharply bounded discrete units that never grade laterally into other rock types.

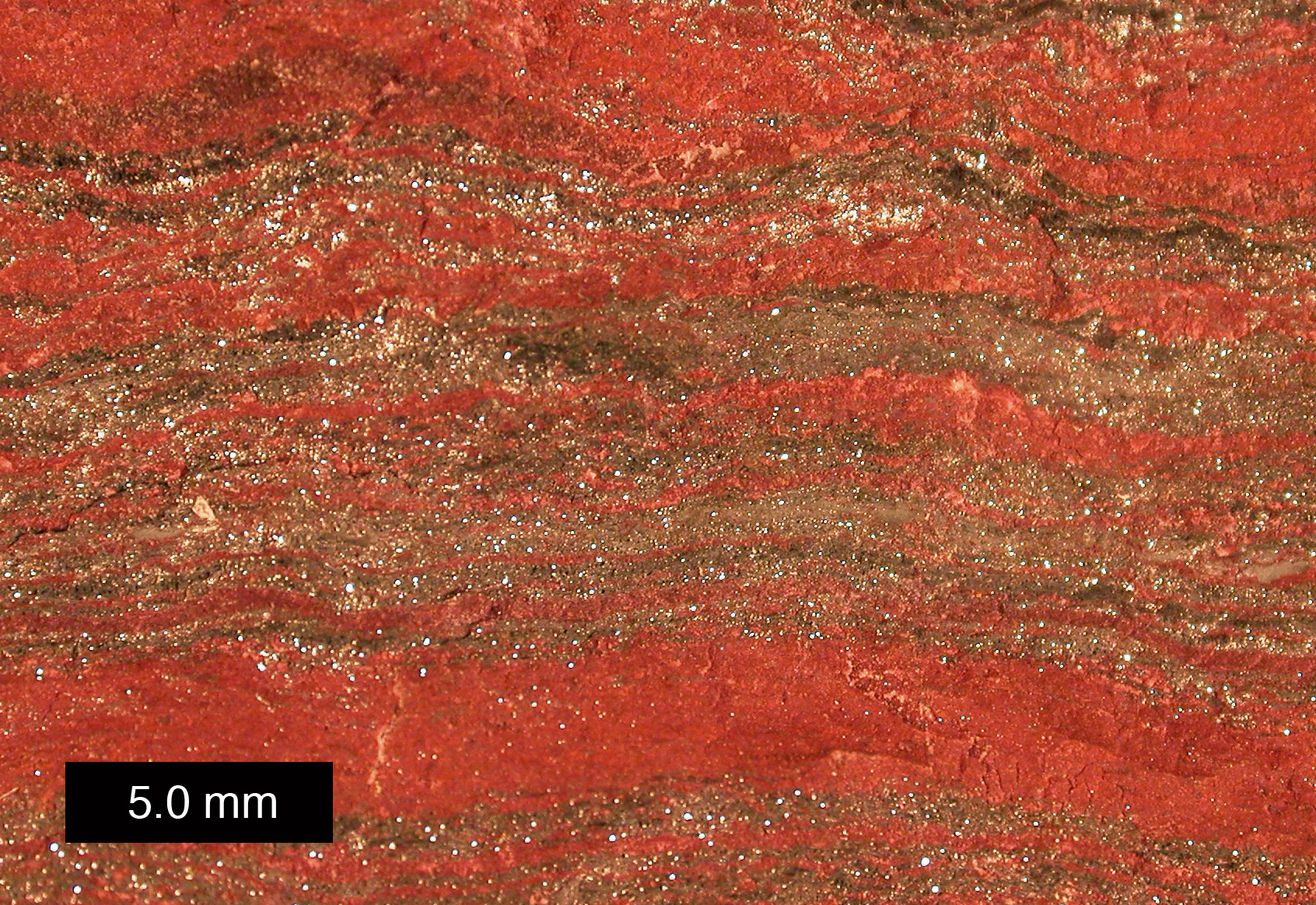
Close-up of banded iron formation specimen from Upper Michigan

Banded iron formations of the Great Lakes region and the Frere Formation of western Australia are somewhat different in character and are sometimes described as granular iron formations or GIFs. Their iron sediments are granular to oolitic in character, forming discrete grains about a millimeter in diameter, and they lack microbanding in their chert mesobands. They also show more irregular mesobanding, with indications of ripples and other sedimentary structures, and their mesobands cannot be traced out any great distance. Though they form well-defined, discrete units, these are commonly interbedded with coarse to medium-grained epiclastic sediments (sediments formed by weathering of rock). These features suggest a higher energy depositional environment, in shallower water disturbed by wave motions. However, they otherwise resemble other banded iron formations.

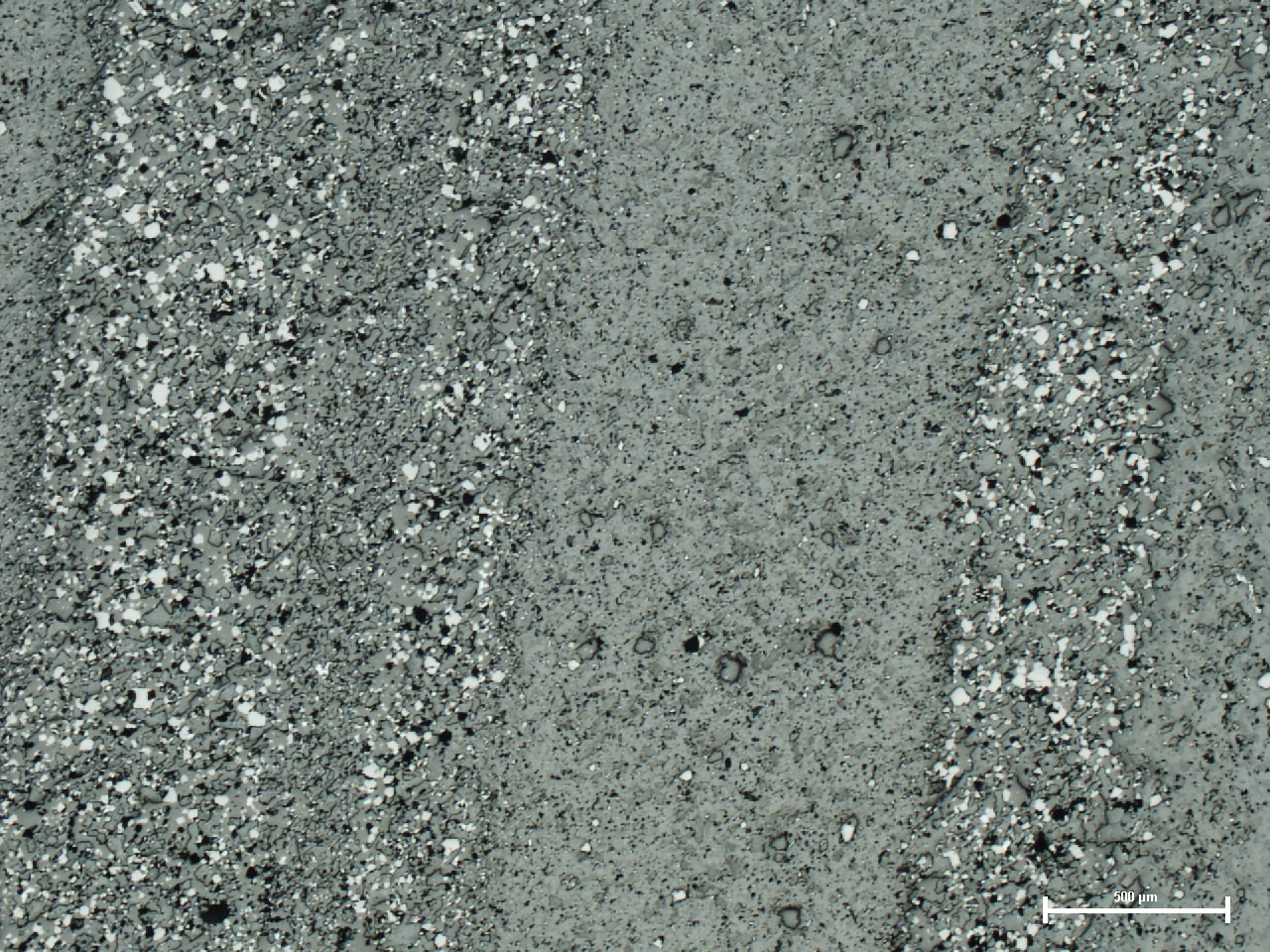
Thin section of Neoproterozoic banded iron formation from Australia

The great majority of banded iron formations are Archean or Paleoproterozoic in age. However, a small number of BIFs are Neoproterozoic in age, and are frequently, if not universally, associated with glacial deposits, often containing glacial dropstones. They also tend to show a higher level of oxidation, with hematite prevailing over magnetite, and they typically contain a small amount of phosphate, about 1% by mass. Mesobanding is often poor to nonexistent and soft-sediment deformation structures are common. This suggests very rapid deposition. However, like the granular iron formations of the Great Lakes, the Neoproterozoic occurrences are widely described as banded iron formations.

Banded iron formations are distinct from most Phanerozoic ironstones. Ironstones are relatively rare and are thought to have been deposited in marine anoxic events, in which the depositional basin became depleted in free oxygen. They are composed of iron silicates and oxides without appreciable chert but with significant phosphorus content, which is lacking in BIFs.

No classification scheme for banded iron formations has gained complete acceptance. In 1954, Harold Lloyd James advocated a classification based on four lithological facies (oxide, carbonate, silicate, and sulfide) assumed to represent different depths of deposition, but this speculative model did not hold up. In 1980, Gordon A. Gross advocated a twofold division of BIFs into an Algoma type and a Lake Superior type, based on the character of the depositional basin. Algoma BIFs are found in relatively small basins in association with greywackes and other volcanic rocks and are assumed to be associated with volcanic centers. Lake Superior BIFs are found in larger basins in association with black shales, quartzites, and dolomites, with relatively minor tuffs or other volcanic rocks, and are assumed to have formed on a continental shelf. This classification has been more widely accepted, but the failure to appreciate that it is strictly based on the characteristics of the depositional basin and not the lithology of the BIF itself has led to confusion, and some geologists have advocated for its abandonment. However, the classification into Algoma versus Lake Superior types continues to be used.

== Occurrence ==
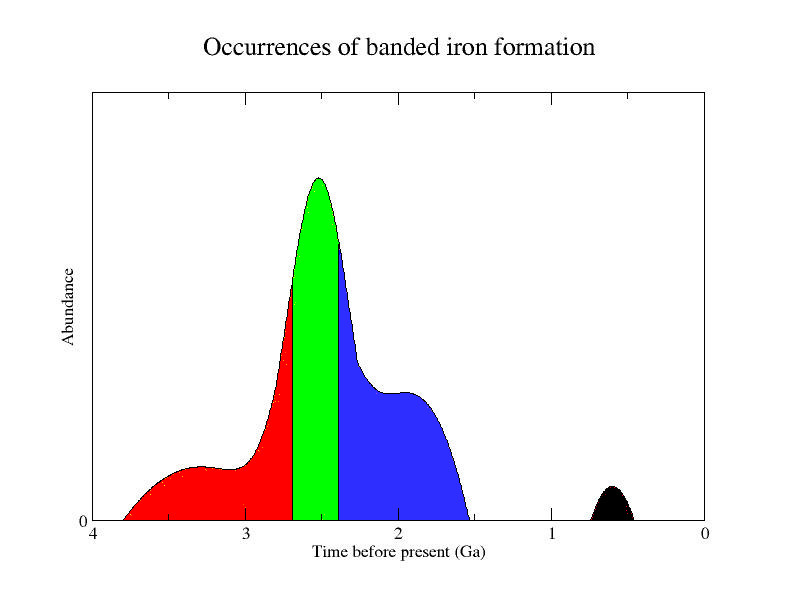
Abundance of banded iron formation in the geologic record. Color indicates dominant type. Red = older Archean formations; green = Greater Gondwana formations; blue = granular iron formations; black = Snowball Earth formations. Adapted from Trendall 2002.

Location of occurrences. Color indicates dominant type. Light yellow = older Archean formations; dark yellow = Greater Gondwana formations; brown = granular iron formations; red = Snowball Earth formations.

Banded iron formations are almost exclusively Precambrian in age, with most deposits dating to the late Archean (2800–2500 Ma) with a secondary peak of deposition in the Orosirian period of the Paleoproterozoic (1850 Ma). Minor amounts were deposited in the early Archean and in the Neoproterozoic (750 Ma). The youngest known banded iron formation is an Early Cambrian formation in western China. Because the processes by which BIFs are formed appear to be restricted to early geologic time, and may reflect unique conditions of the Precambrian world, they have been intensively studied by geologists.

Banded iron formations are found worldwide, in every continental shield of every continent. The oldest BIFs are associated with greenstone belts and include the BIFs of the Isua Greenstone Belt, the oldest known, which have an estimated age of 3700 to 3800 Ma. The Temagami banded iron deposits formed over a 50-million-year period, from 2736 to 2687 Ma, and reached a thickness of 60 meters (200 feet). Other examples of early Archean BIFs are found in the Abitibi greenstone belts, the greenstone belts of the Yilgarn and Pilbara cratons, the Baltic Shield, and the cratons of the Amazon, north China, and south and west Africa.

The most extensive banded iron formations belong to what A.F. Trendall calls the Great Gondwana BIFs. These are late Archean in age and are not associated with greenstone belts. They are relatively undeformed and form extensive topographic plateaus, such as the Hamersley Range. The banded iron formations here were deposited from 2470 to 2450 Ma and are the thickest and most extensive in the world, with a maximum thickness in excess of 900 meters (3,000 feet). Similar BIFs are found in the Carajás Formation of the Amazon craton, the Cauê Itabirite of the São Francisco craton, the Kuruman Iron Formation and Penge Iron Formation of South Africa, and the Mulaingiri Formation of India.

Paleoproterozoic banded iron formations are found in the Iron Range and other parts of the Canadian Shield. The Iron Range is a group of four major deposits: the Mesabi Range, the Vermilion Range, the Gunflint Range, and the Cuyuna Range. All are part of the Animikie Group and were deposited between 2500 and 1800 Ma. These BIFs are predominantly granular iron formations.

Neoproterozoic banded iron formations include the Urucum in Brazil, Rapitan in the Yukon, and the Damara Belt in southern Africa. They are relatively limited in size, with horizontal extents not more than a few tens of kilometers and thicknesses not more than about 10 meters (33 feet). These are widely thought to have been deposited under unusual anoxic oceanic conditions associated with the "Snowball Earth."

== Origins ==
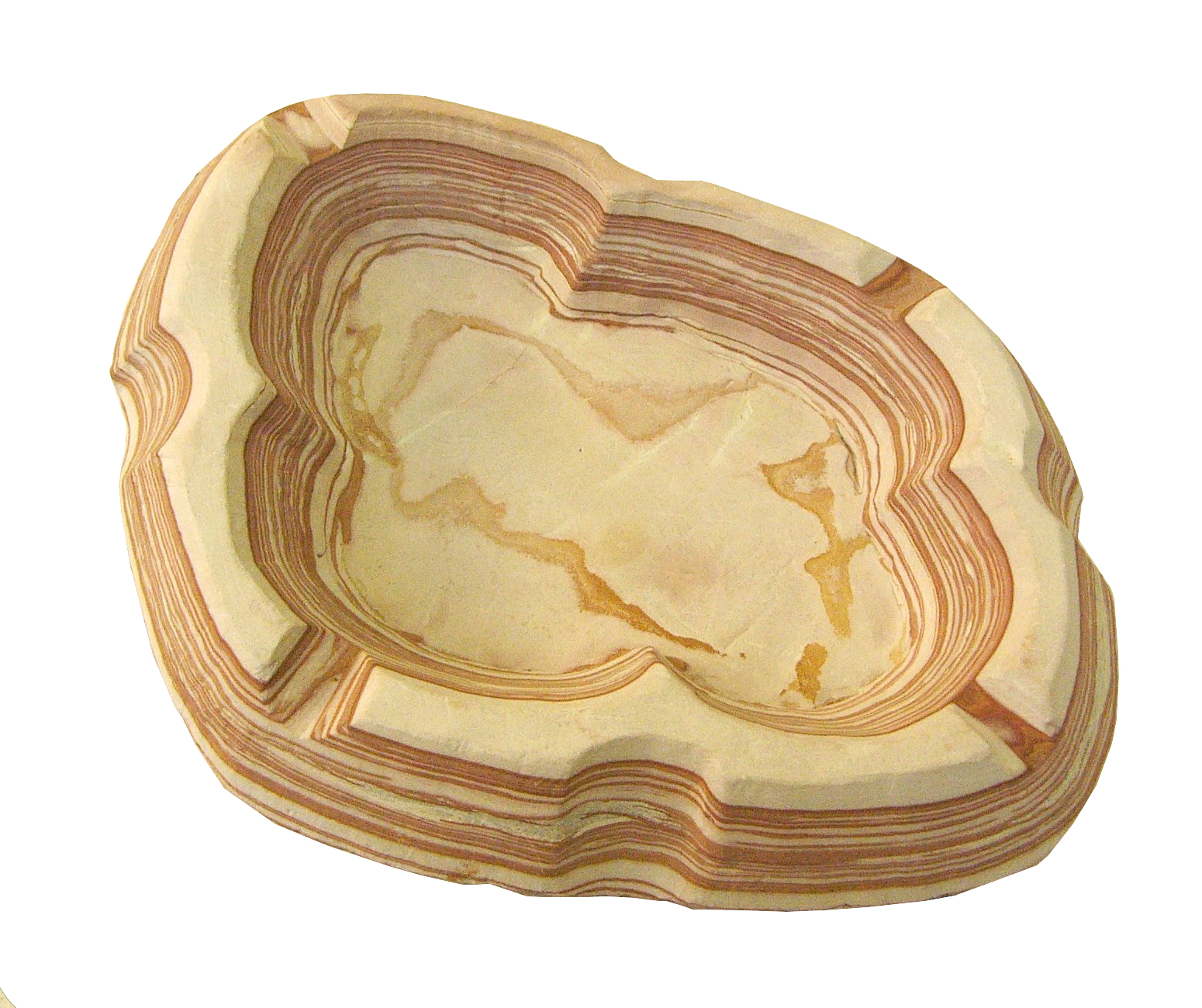
An ashtray carved out of a soft form of banded ironstone from the Barbeton Supergroup in South Africa. The red layers were laid down when Archaean photosynthesizing cyanobacteria produced oxygen that reacted with dissolved iron compounds in the water, to form insoluble iron oxide (rust). The white layers are sediments that settled when there was no oxygen in the water, or when dissolved Fe^{2+} was temporarily depleted.

Banded iron formation provided some of the first evidence for the timing of the Great Oxidation Event, 2,400 Ma. With his 1968 paper on the early atmosphere and oceans of the Earth, Preston Cloud established the general framework that has been widely, if not universally, accepted for understanding the deposition of BIFs.

Cloud postulated that banded iron formations were a consequence of anoxic, iron-rich waters from the deep ocean welling up into a photic zone inhabited by cyanobacteria that had evolved the capacity to carry out oxygen-producing photosynthesis, but which had not yet evolved enzymes (such as superoxide dismutase) for living in an oxygenated environment. Such organisms would have been protected from their own oxygen waste through its rapid removal via the reservoir of reduced ferrous iron, Fe(II), in the early ocean. The oxygen released by photosynthesis oxidized the Fe(II) to ferric iron, Fe(III), which precipitated out of the sea water as insoluble iron oxides that settled to the ocean floor.

Cloud suggested that banding resulted from fluctuations in the population of cyanobacteria due to free radical damage by oxygen. This also explained the relatively limited extent of early Archean deposits. The great peak in BIF deposition at the end of the Archean was thought to be the result of the evolution of mechanisms for living with oxygen. This ended self-poisoning and produced a population explosion in the cyanobacteria that rapidly depleted the remaining supply of reduced iron and ended most BIF deposition. Oxygen then began to accumulate in the atmosphere.

Some details of Cloud's original model were abandoned. For example, improved dating of Precambrian strata has shown that the late Archean peak of BIF deposition was spread out over tens of millions of years, rather than taking place in a very short interval of time following the evolution of oxygen-coping mechanisms. However, his general concepts continue to shape thinking about the origins of banded iron formations. In particular, the concept of the upwelling of deep ocean water, rich in reduced iron, into an oxygenated surface layer poor in iron remains a key element of most theories of deposition.

The few formations deposited after 1,800 Ma may point to intermittent low levels of free atmospheric oxygen, while the small peak at 750 million years ago may be associated with the hypothetical Snowball Earth.

=== Formation processes ===
The microbands within chert layers are most likely varves produced by annual variations in oxygen production. Diurnal microbanding would require a very high rate of deposition of 2 meters per year or 5 km/Ma. Estimates of deposition rate based on various models of deposition and sensitive high-resolution ion microprobe (SHRIMP) estimates of the age of associated tuff beds suggest a deposition rate in typical BIFs of 19 to 270 m/Ma, which are consistent either with annual varves or rhythmites produced by tidal cycles.

Preston Cloud proposed that mesobanding was a result of self-poisoning by early cyanobacteria as the supply of reduced iron was periodically depleted. Mesobanding has also been interpreted as a secondary structure, not present in the sediments as originally laid down, but produced during compaction of the sediments. Another theory is that mesobands are primary structures resulting from pulses of activity along mid-ocean ridges that change the availability of reduced iron on time scales of decades. In the case of granular iron formations, the mesobands are attributed to winnowing of sediments in shallow water, in which wave action tended to segregate particles of different size and composition.

For banded iron formations to be deposited, several preconditions must be met.

1. The deposition basin must contain waters that are ferruginous (rich in iron).
2. This implies they are also anoxic, since ferrous iron oxidizes to ferric iron within hours or days in the presence of dissolved oxygen. This would prevent transport of large quantities of iron from its sources to the deposition basin.
3. The waters must not be euxinic (rich in hydrogen sulfide), since this would cause the ferrous iron to precipitate out as pyrite.
4. There must be an oxidation mechanism active within the depositional basin that steadily converts the reservoir of ferrous iron to ferric iron.

==== Source of reduced iron ====
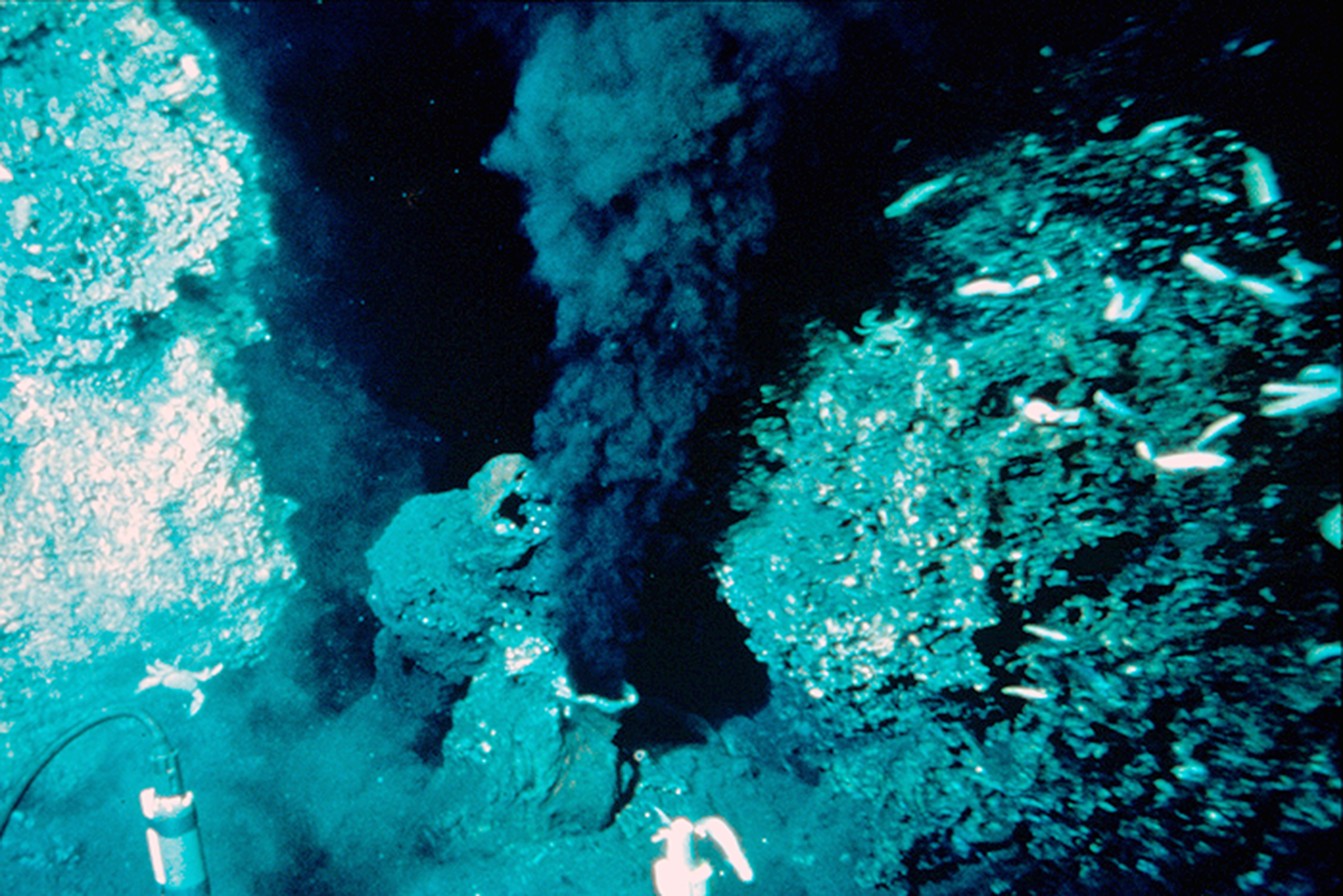
Hydrothermal vents were one important source for the reduced iron that was later oxidized to form banded iron formations.

There must be an ample source of reduced iron that can circulate freely into the deposition basin. Plausible sources of iron include hydrothermal vents along mid-ocean ridges, windblown dust, rivers, glacial ice, and seepage from continental margins.

The importance of various sources of reduced iron has likely changed dramatically across geologic time. This is reflected in the division of BIFs into Algoma and Lake Superior-type deposits. Algoma-type BIFs formed primarily in the Archean. These older BIFs tend to show a positive europium anomaly consistent with a hydrothermal source of iron. By contrast, Lake Superior-type banded iron formations primarily formed during the Paleoproterozoic era, and lack the europium anomalies of the older Algoma-type BIFs, suggesting a much greater input of iron weathered from continents.

==== Absence of oxygen or hydrogen sulfide ====
The absence of hydrogen sulfide in anoxic ocean water can be explained either by reduced sulfur flux into the deep ocean or a lack of dissimilatory sulfate reduction (DSR), the process by which microorganisms use sulfate in place of oxygen for respiration. The product of DSR is hydrogen sulfide, which readily precipitates iron out of solution as pyrite.

The requirement of an anoxic, but not euxinic, deep ocean for deposition of banded iron formation suggests two models to explain the end of BIF deposition 1.8 billion years ago. The "Holland ocean" model proposes that the deep ocean became sufficiently oxygenated at that time to end transport of reduced iron. Heinrich Holland argues that the absence of manganese deposits during the pause between Paleoproterozoic and Neoproterozoic BIFs is evidence that the deep ocean had become at least slightly oxygenated. The "Canfield ocean" model proposes that, to the contrary, the deep ocean became euxinic and transport of reduced iron was blocked by precipitation as pyrite.

Banded iron formations in northern Minnesota are overlain by a thick layer of ejecta from the Sudbury Basin impact. An asteroid (estimated at 10 km (6.2 mi) across) impacted into waters about 1,000 m (3,300 ft) deep 1.849 billion years ago, coincident with the pause in BIF deposition. Computer models suggest that the impact would have generated a tsunami at least 1,000 m (3,300 ft) high at the point of impact, and 100 m (330 ft) high about 3,000 km (1,900 mi) away. It has been suggested that the immense waves and large underwater landslides triggered by the impact caused the mixing of a previously stratified ocean, oxygenated the deep ocean, and ended BIF deposition shortly after the impact.

==== Oxidation ====
Although Cloud argued that microbial activity was a key process in the deposition of banded iron formation, the role of oxygenic versus anoxygenic photosynthesis continues to be debated, and nonbiogenic processes have also been proposed.

===== Oxygenic photosynthesis =====
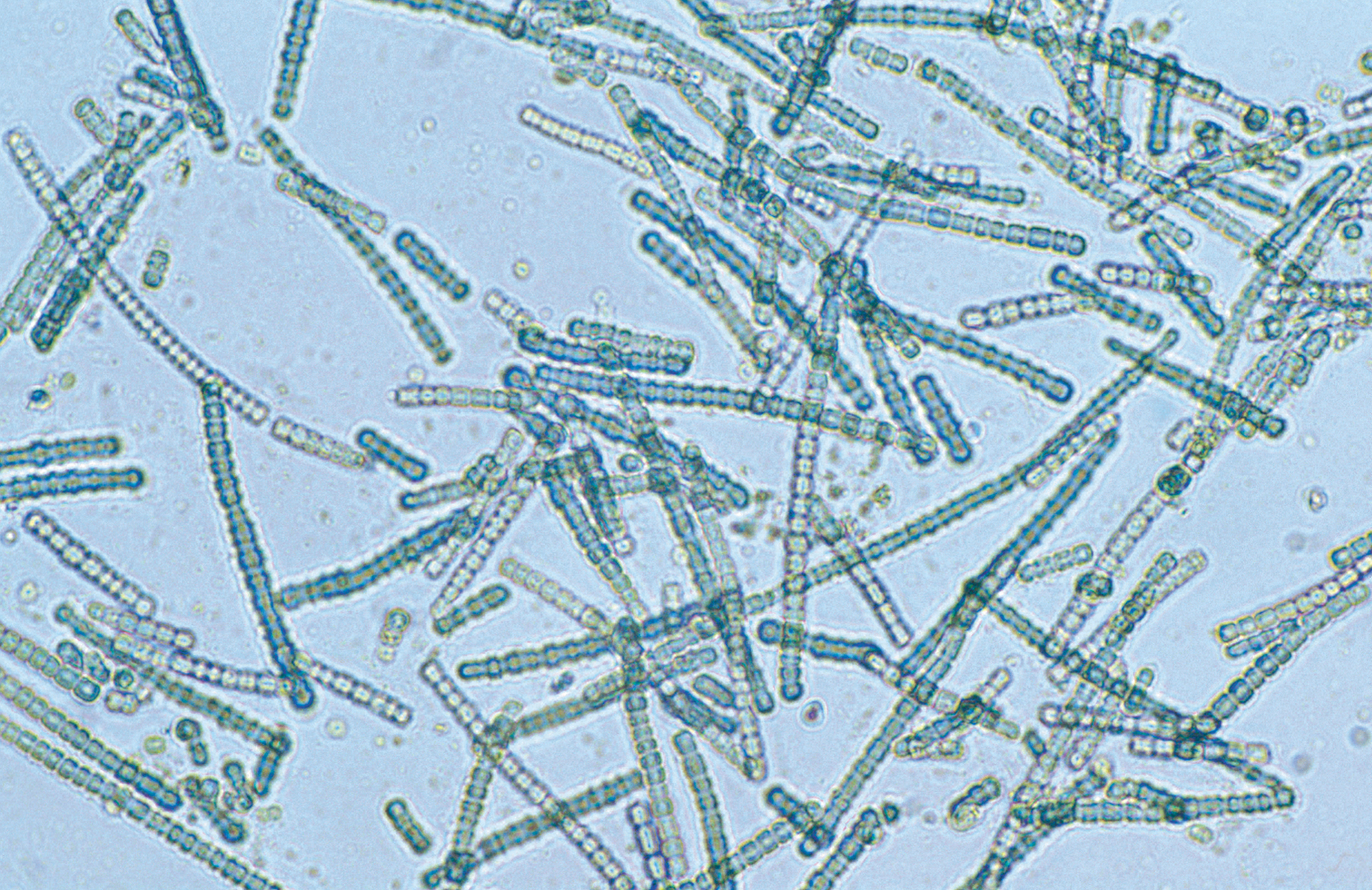
Cyanobacteria species Cylindrospermum sp. under magnification

Cloud's original hypothesis was that ferrous iron was oxidized in a straightforward manner by molecular oxygen present in the water:

4 Fe^{2+} + O_{2} + 10 H_{2}O → 4 Fe(OH)_{3} + 8 H^{+}

The oxygen comes from the photosynthetic activities of cyanobacteria. Oxidation of ferrous iron may have been hastened by aerobic iron-oxidizing bacteria, which can increase rates of oxidation by a factor of 50 under conditions of low oxygen.

===== Anoxygenic photosynthesis =====
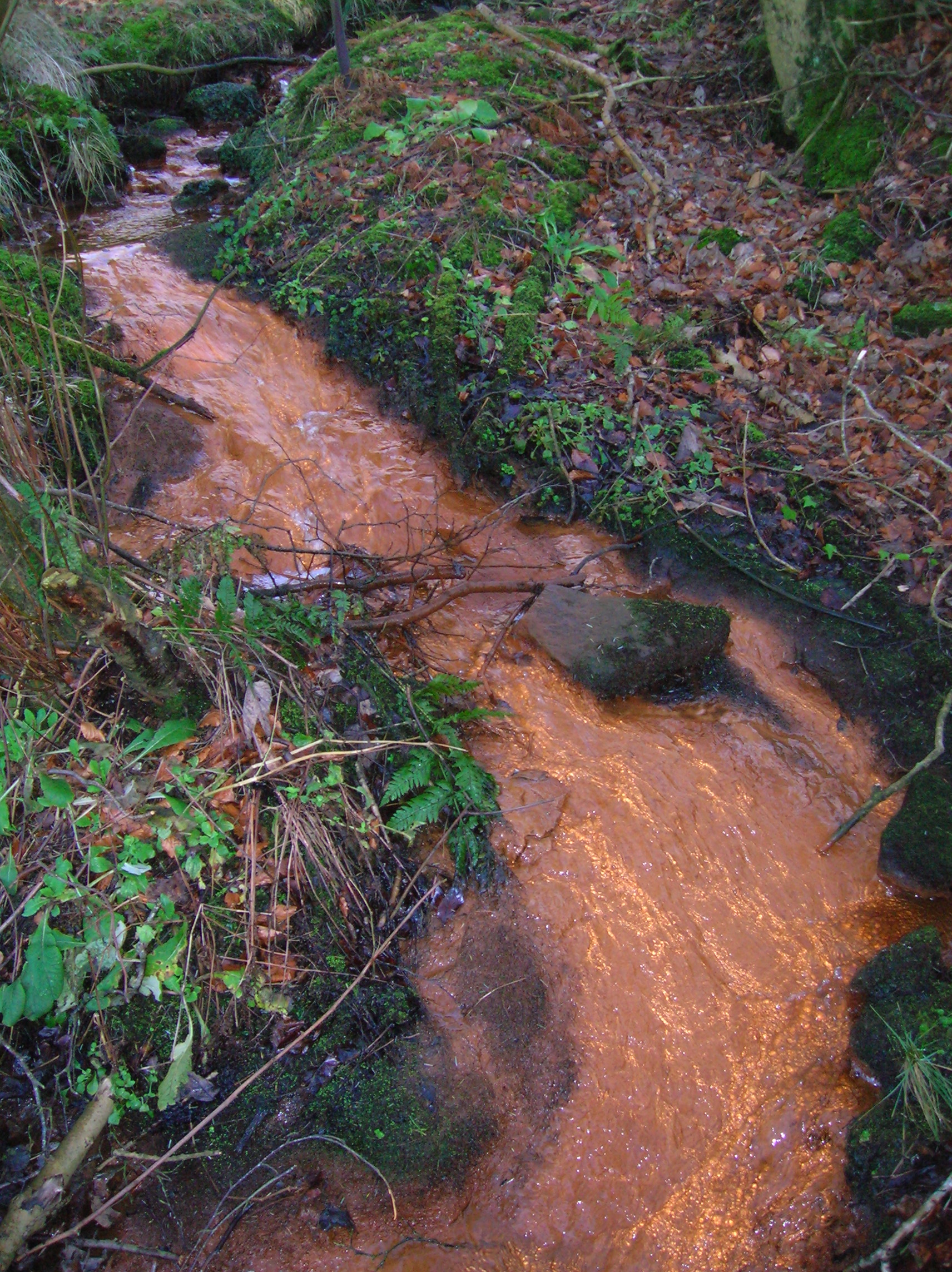
A burn in Scotland with iron-oxidizing bacteria

Oxygenic photosynthesis is not the only biogenic mechanism for deposition of banded iron formations. Some geochemists have suggested that banded iron formations could form by direct oxidation of iron by microbial anoxygenic phototrophs. The concentrations of phosphorus and trace metals in BIFs are consistent with precipitation through the activities of iron-oxidizing bacteria.

Iron isotope ratios in the oldest banded iron formations (3700-3800 Ma), at Isua, Greenland, are best explained by assuming extremely low oxygen levels (<0.001% of modern O_{2} levels in the photic zone) and anoxygenic photosynthetic oxidation of Fe(II):

4 Fe^{2+} + 11 H_{2}O + CO_{2} + hv → CH_{2}O + 4 Fe(OH)_{3} + 8 H^{+}

This requires that dissimilatory iron reduction, the biological process in which microorganisms substitute Fe(III) for oxygen in respiration, was not yet widespread. By contrast, Lake Superior-type banded iron formations show iron isotope ratios that suggest that dissimilatory iron reduction expanded greatly during this period.

An alternate route is oxidation by anaerobic denitrifying bacteria. This requires that nitrogen fixation by microorganisms is also active.

10 Fe^{2+} + 2 NO^{−}_{3} + 24 H_{2}O → 10 Fe(OH)_{3} + N_{2} + 18 H^{+}

===== Abiogenic mechanisms =====
The lack of organic carbon in banded iron formation argues against microbial control of BIF deposition. On the other hand, there is fossil evidence for abundant photosynthesizing cyanobacteria at the start of BIF deposition and of hydrocarbon markers in shales within banded iron formation of the Pilbara craton. The carbon that is present in banded iron formations is enriched in the light isotope, ^{12}C, an indicator of a biological origin. If a substantial part of the original iron oxides was in the form of hematite, then any carbon in the sediments might have been oxidized by the decarbonization reaction:

6 Fe_{2}O_{3} + C ⇌ 4 Fe_{3}O_{4} + CO_{2}

Trendall and J.G. Blockley proposed, but later rejected, the hypothesis that banded iron formation might be a peculiar kind of Precambrian evaporite. Other proposed abiogenic processes include radiolysis by the radioactive isotope of potassium, ^{40}K, or annual turnover of basin water combined with upwelling of iron-rich water in a stratified ocean.

Another abiogenic mechanism is photochemical oxidation of Fe(II) by sunlight. Laboratory experiments suggest that this could produce a sufficiently high deposition rate under likely conditions of pH and sunlight. However, if the iron came from a shallow hydrothermal source, other laboratory experiments suggest that precipitation of ferrous iron as carbonates or silicates could seriously compete with photooxidation.

==== Diagenesis ====
Regardless of the precise mechanism of oxidation, the oxidation of ferrous to ferric iron likely caused the iron to precipitate out as a ferric hydroxide gel. Similarly, the silica component of the banded iron formations likely precipitated as a hydrous silica gel. The conversion of iron hydroxide and silica gels to banded iron formation is an example of diagenesis, the conversion of sediments into solid rock.

There is evidence that banded iron formations formed from sediments with nearly the same chemical composition as is found in the BIFs today. The BIFs of the Hamersley Range show great chemical homogeneity and lateral uniformity, with no indication of any precursor rock that might have been altered to the current composition. This suggests that, other than dehydration and decarbonization of the original ferric hydroxide and silica gels, diagenesis likely left the composition unaltered and consisted of crystallization of the original gels. Decarbonization may account for the lack of carbon and preponderance of magnetite in older banded iron formations. The relatively high content of hematite in Neoproterozoic BIFs suggests they were deposited very quickly and via a process that did not produce great quantities of biomass, so that little carbon was present to reduce hematite to magnetite.

However, it is possible that BIF was altered from carbonate rock or from hydrothermal mud during late stages of diagenesis. A 2018 study found no evidence that magnetite in BIF formed by decarbonization, and suggests that it formed from thermal decomposition of siderite via the reaction

3 FeCO_{3} + H_{2}O → Fe_{3}O_{4} + 3 CO_{2} + H_{2}

The iron may have originally precipitated as greenalite and other iron silicates. Macrobanding is then interpreted as a product of compaction of the original iron silicate mud. This produced siderite-rich bands that served as pathways for fluid flow and formation of magnetite.

=== Great Oxidation Event ===
Oxygen (O_{2}) build-up in the Earth's atmosphere. Red and green lines represent the range of the estimates while time is measured in billions of years ago (Ga). Banded formation iron deposition peaks at the beginning of Stage 2 and pauses at the beginning of Stage 3.

The peak of deposition of banded iron formations in the late Archean, and the end of deposition in the Orosirian, have been interpreted as markers for the Great Oxygenation Event. Prior to 2.45 billion years ago, the high degree of mass-independent fractionation of sulfur (MIF-S) indicates an extremely oxygen-poor atmosphere. The peak of banded iron formation deposition coincides with the disappearance of the MIF-S signal, which is interpreted as the permanent appearance of oxygen in the atmosphere between 2.41 and 2.35 billion years ago. This was accompanied by the development of a stratified ocean with a deep anoxic layer and a shallow oxidized layer. The end of deposition of BIF at 1.85 billion years ago is attributed to the oxidation of the deep ocean.

=== Snowball Earth hypothesis ===
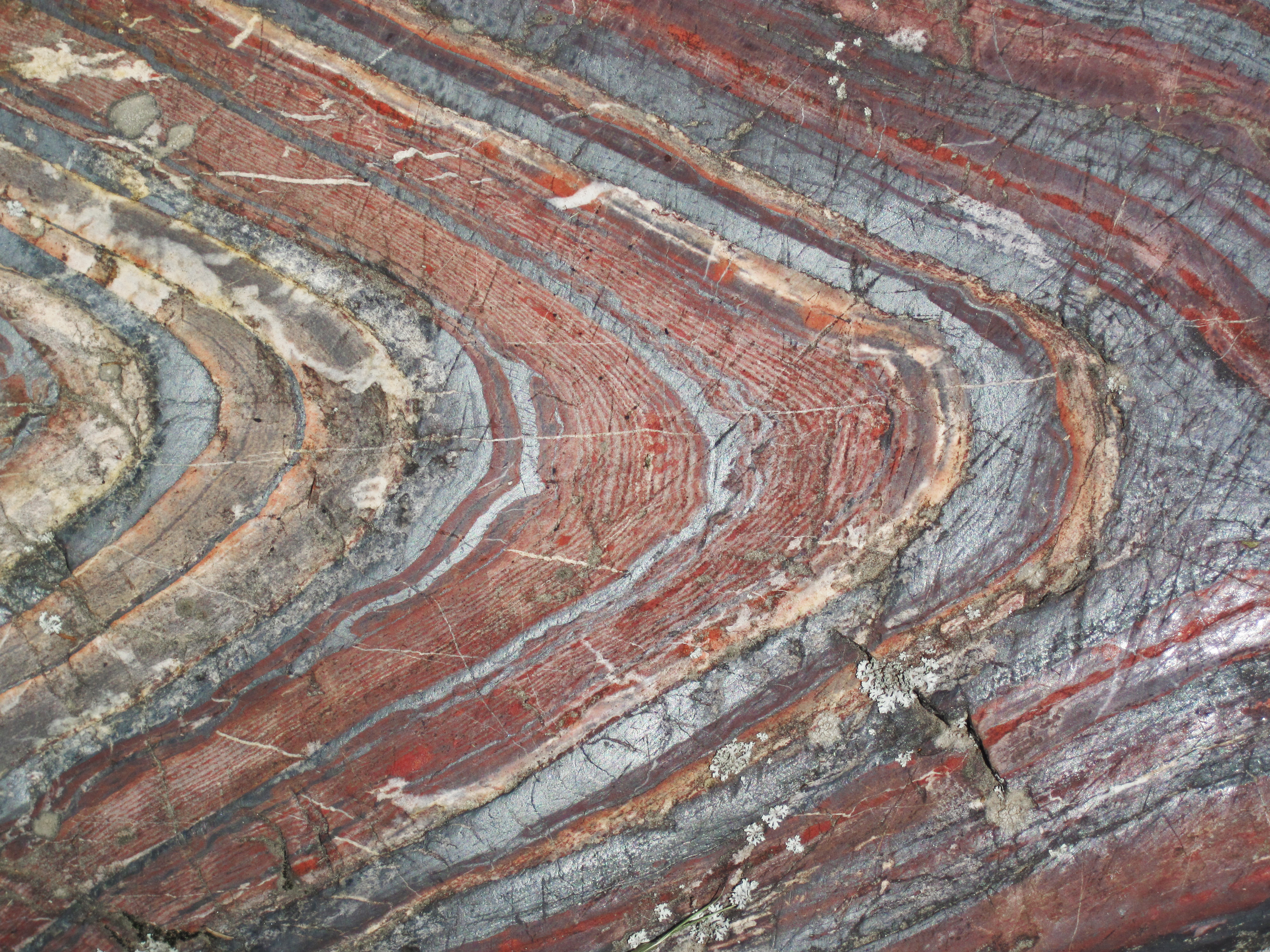
Neoarchean banded iron formation from northeastern Minnesota

Until 1992 it was assumed that the rare, later (younger) banded iron deposits represented unusual conditions where oxygen was depleted locally. Iron-rich waters would then form in isolation and subsequently come into contact with oxygenated water. The Snowball Earth hypothesis provided an alternative explanation for these younger deposits. In a Snowball Earth state the continents, and possibly seas at low latitudes, were subject to a severe ice age circa 750 to 580 Ma that nearly or totally depleted free oxygen. Dissolved iron then accumulated in the oxygen-poor oceans (possibly from seafloor hydrothermal vents). Following the thawing of the Earth, the seas became oxygenated once more causing the precipitation of the iron. Banded iron formations of this period are predominantly associated with the Sturtian glaciation.

An alternative mechanism for banded iron formations in the Snowball Earth era suggests the iron was deposited from metal-rich brines in the vicinity of hydrothermally active rift zones due to glacially-driven thermal overturn. The limited extent of these BIFs compared with the associated glacial deposits, their association with volcanic formations, and variation in thickness and facies favor this hypothesis. Such a mode of formation does not require a global anoxic ocean, but is consistent with either a Snowball Earth or Slushball Earth model.

== Economic geology ==
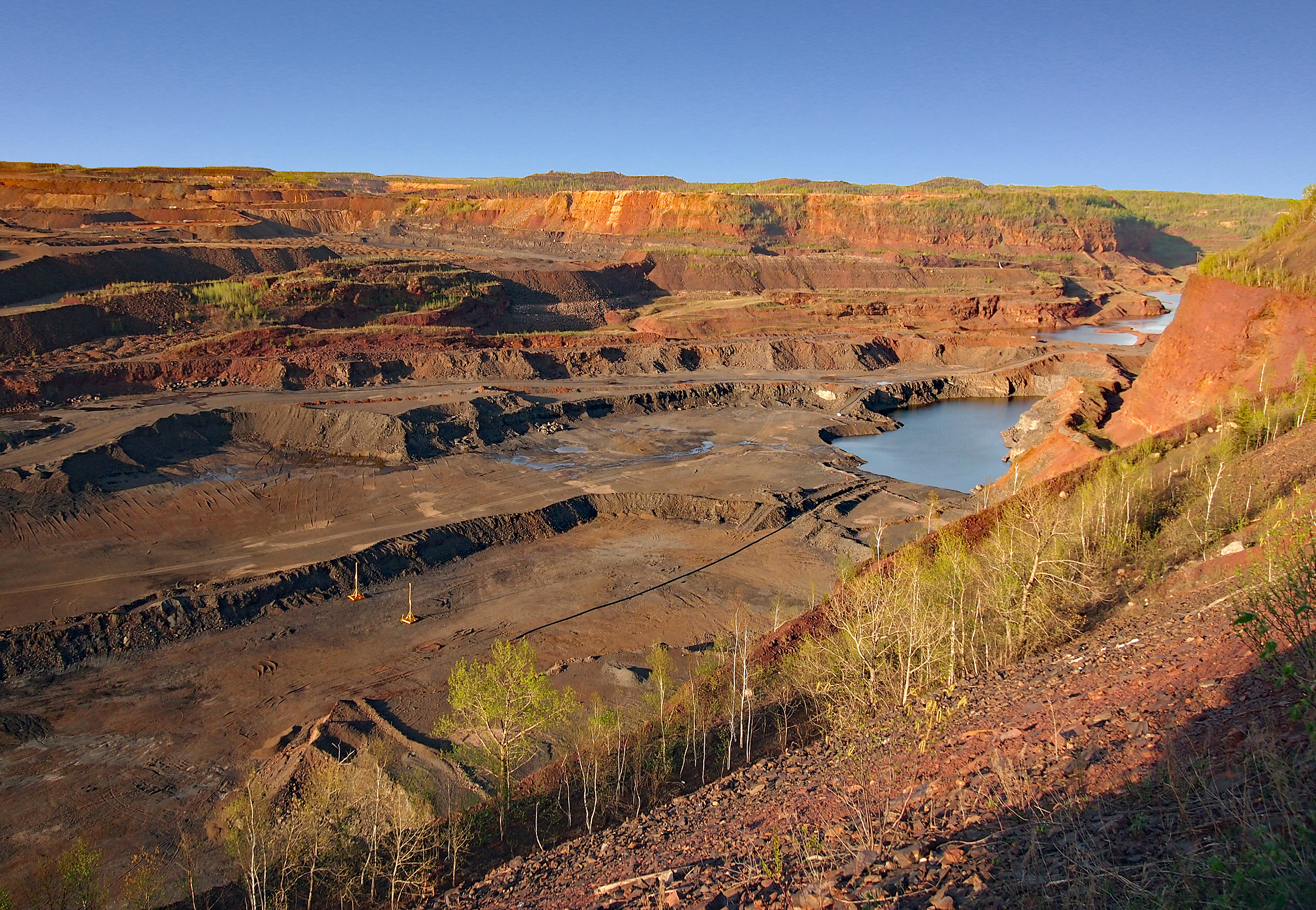
Hull-Rust-Mahoning Open Pit Iron Mine in the Iron Range

Banded iron formations provide most of the iron ore presently mined. More than 60% of global iron reserves are in the form of banded iron formation, most of which can be found in Australia, Brazil, Canada, India, Russia, South Africa, Ukraine, and the United States.

Different mining districts coined their own names for BIFs. The term "banded iron formation" was coined in the iron districts of Lake Superior, where the ore deposits of the Mesabi, Marquette, Cuyuna, Gogebic, and Menominee iron ranges were also variously known as "jasper", "jaspilite", "iron-bearing formation", or taconite. Banded iron formations were described as "itabarite" in Brazil, as "ironstone" in South Africa, and as "BHQ" (banded hematite quartzite) in India.

Banded iron formation was first discovered in northern Michigan in 1844, and mining of these deposits prompted the earliest studies of BIFs, such as those of Charles R. Van Hise and Charles Kenneth Leith. Iron mining operations on the Mesabi and Cuyuna Ranges evolved into enormous open pit mines, where steam shovels and other industrial machines could remove massive amounts of ore. Initially the mines exploited large beds of hematite and goethite weathered out of the banded iron formations, and some 2,500,000,000 t (2.5×10^{9} long tons; 2.8×10^{9} short tons) of this "natural ore" had been extracted by 1980. By 1956, large-scale commercial production from the BIF itself began at the Peter Mitchell Mine near Babbitt, Minnesota. Production in Minnesota was 40,000,000 t (39,000,000 long tons; 44,000,000 short tons) of ore concentrate per year in 2016, which is about 75% of total U.S. production. Magnetite-rich banded iron formation, known locally as taconite, is ground to a powder, and the magnetite is separated with powerful magnets and pelletized for shipment and smelting.

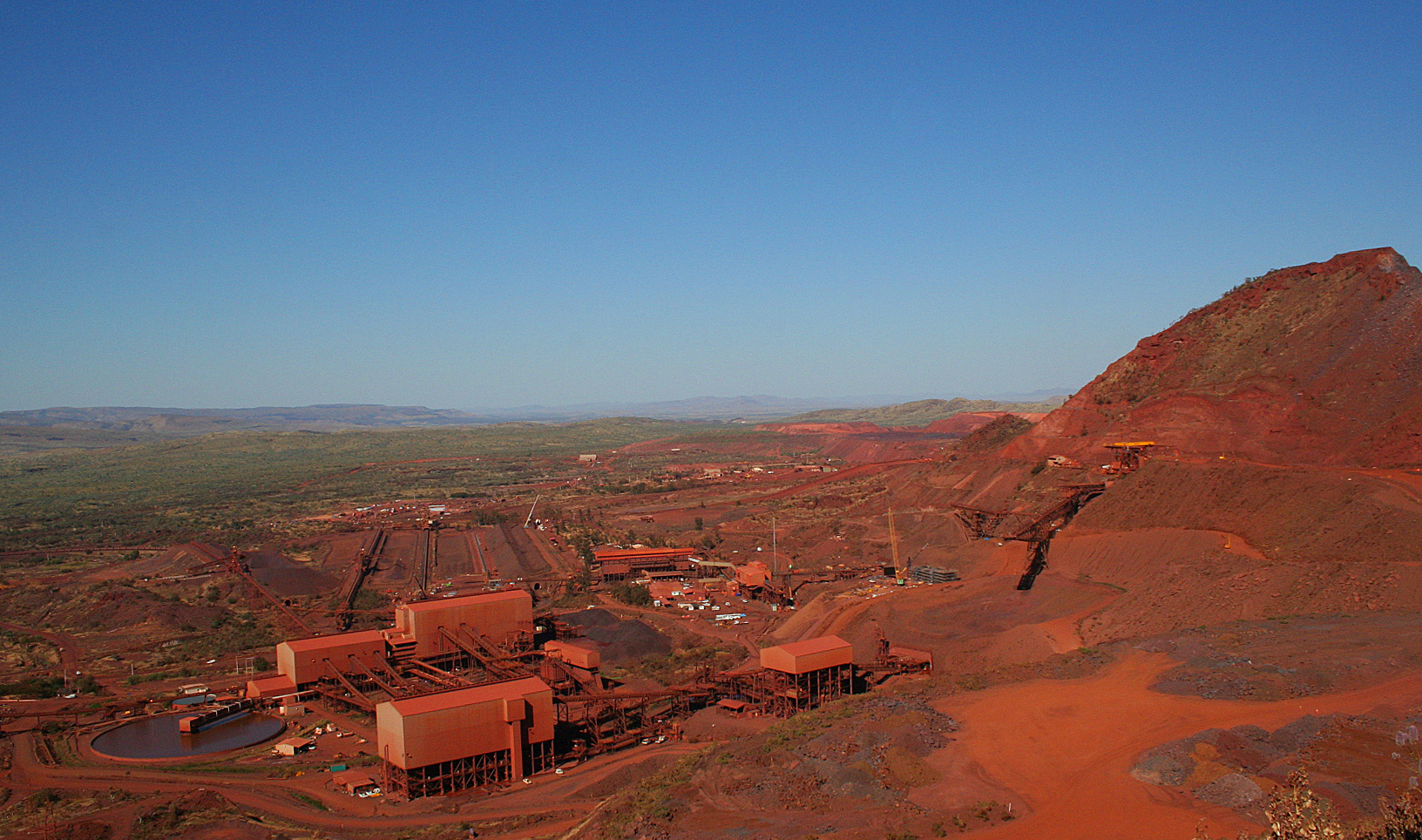
Tom Price Mine, Hamersley Range, Australia

Iron ore became a global commodity after the Second World War, and with the end of the embargo against exporting iron ore from Australia in 1960, the Hamersley Range became a major mining district. The banded iron formations here are the thickest and most extensive in the world, originally covering an area of 150,000 square kilometers (58,000 square miles) and containing about 300,000,000,000 t (3.0×10^{11} long tons; 3.3×10^{11} short tons) of iron. The range contains 80 percent of all identified iron ore reserves in Australia. Over 100,000,000 t (98,000,000 long tons; 110,000,000 short tons) of iron ore is removed from the range every year.

The Itabarite banded iron formations of Brazil cover at least 80,000 square kilometers (31,000 square miles) and are up to 600 meters (2,000 feet) thick. These form the Quadrilatero Ferrifero or Iron Quadrangle, which resembles the Iron Range mines of United States in that the favored ore is hematite weathered out of the BIFs. Production from the Iron Quadrangle helps make Brazil the second largest producer of iron ore after Australia, with monthly exports averaging 139,299 t (137,099 long tons; 153,551 short tons) from December 2007 to May 2018.

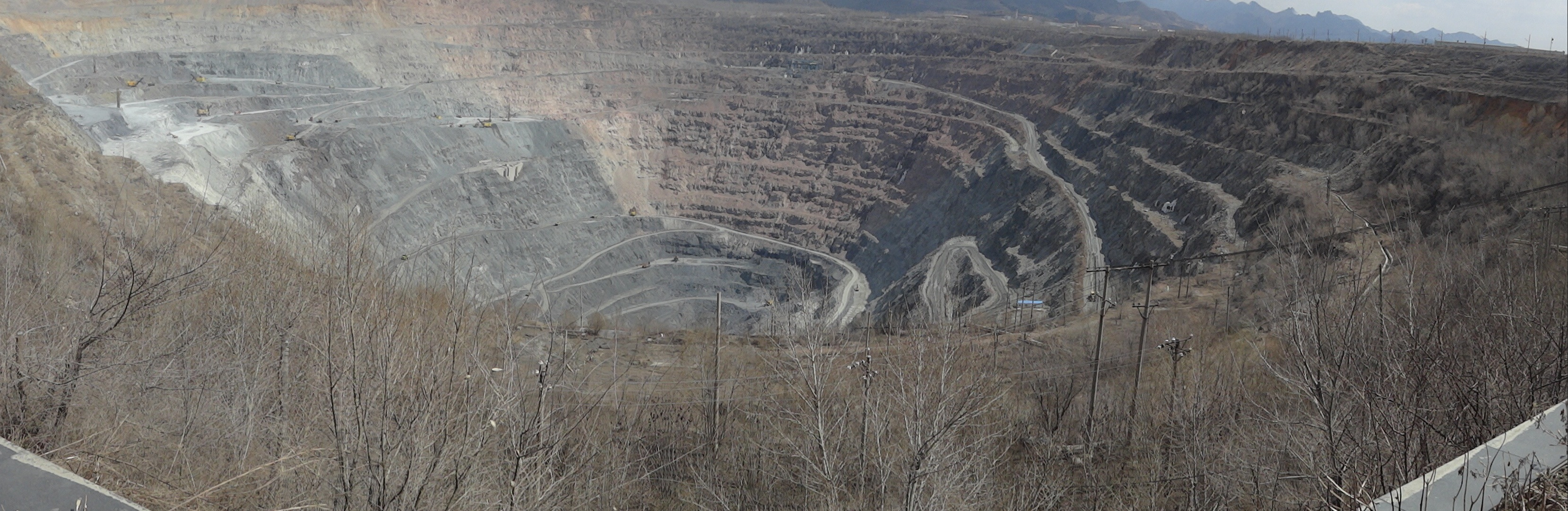
Qidashan open cast iron ore mine, one of three large pits surrounding Anshan city

Mining of ore from banded iron formations at Anshan in north China began in 1918. When Japan occupied Northeast China in 1931, these mills were turned into a Japanese-owned monopoly, and the city became a significant strategic industrial hub during the Second World War. Total production of processed iron in Manchuria reached 1,000,000 t (980,000 long tons; 1,100,000 short tons) in 1931–1932. By 1942, Anshan's Shōwa Steel Works total production capacity reached 3,600,000 t (3,500,000 long tons; 4,000,000 short tons) per annum, making it one of the major iron and steel centers in the world. Production was severely disrupted during the Soviet occupation of Manchuria in 1945 and the subsequent Chinese Civil War. However, from 1948 to 2001, the steel works produced 290,000,000 t (290,000,000 long tons; 320,000,000 short tons) 290 million tons of steel, 284,000,000 t (280,000,000 long tons; 313,000,000 short tons) of pig iron and 192,000,000 t (189,000,000 long tons; 212,000,000 short tons) of rolled steel. Annual production capacity as of 2006 is 10,000,000 t (9,800,000 long tons; 11,000,000 short tons) of pig iron, 10,000,000 t (9,800,000 long tons; 11,000,000 short tons) of steel and 9,500,000 t (9,300,000 long tons; 10,500,000 short tons) of rolled steel. A quarter of China's total iron ore reserves, about 10,000,000,000 t (9.8×10^{9} long tons; 1.1×10^{10} short tons), are located in Anshan.

== See also ==
- Iron-rich sedimentary rocks – Sedimentary rocks containing 15 wt.% or more iron
- Stromatolite – Layered sedimentary structure
