= Stilpnomelane =

Phyllosilicate mineral

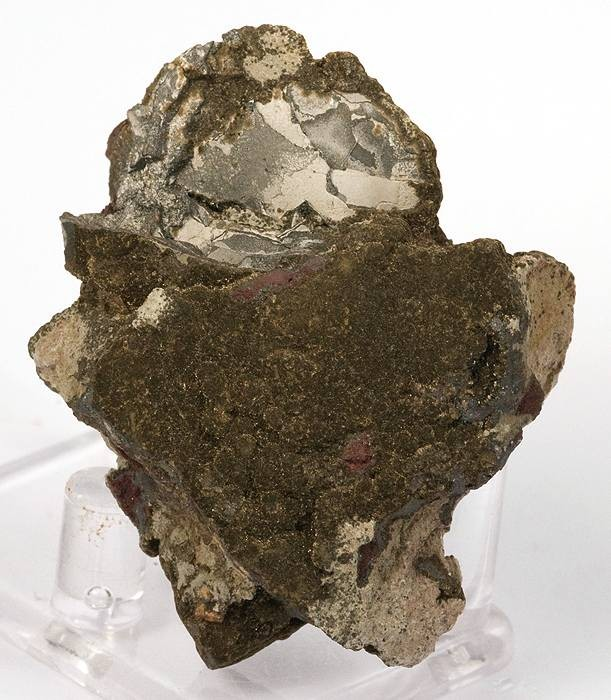

General
- Category: Phyllosilicate minerals
- Group: Stilpnomelane group
- Formula: K(Fe^{2+},Mg,Fe^{3+})_{8}(Si,Al)_{12}(O,OH)_{27}·n(H_{2}O)
- IMA symbol: Stp
- Strunz classification: 9.EG.40
- Crystal system: Triclinic
- Crystal class: Pinacoidal (1̅) (same H-M symbol)
- Space group: P1̅
- Unit cell: a = 21.72 Å, b = 21.72 Å c = 17.4 Å; α = 124.14° β = 95.86°, γ = 120°; Z = 6

Identification
- Color: Black, greenish black, yellowish bronze, greenish bronze
- Crystal habit: Platey, scaly and fibrous with comb structures; radiating groups
- Cleavage: Perfect on {001}, imperfect on {010}
- Tenacity: Brittle
- Mohs scale hardness: 3–4
- Luster: Vitreous to dull
- Streak: Gray white
- Diaphaneity: Subtranslucent to opaque
- Specific gravity: 2.77 – 2.96
- Optical properties: Biaxial (−)
- Refractive index: n_{α} = 1.543 – 1.634 n_{β} = 1.576 – 1.745 n_{γ} = 1.576 – 1.745
- Birefringence: δ = 0.033 – 0.111
- Pleochroism: X: bright golden yellow to pale yellow Y and Z: deep reddish brown, to deep green to nearly black
- 2V angle: 0–40 measured
- Dispersion: None

Stilpnomelane is a phyllosilicate mineral. It has the chemical formula K(Fe^{2+},Mg,Fe^{3+})_{8}(Si,Al)_{12}(O,OH)_{27}·n(H_{2}O).

Stilpnomelane occurs associated with banded iron formations. It is a metamorphic mineral associated with the blueschist and greenschist facies.

It was first described in 1827 for an occurrence in Moravia in the Czech Republic. The name is derived from the Greek stilpnos for shining, and melanos for black.
