= Float (sculpture) =

Public sculpture in Wisconsin

- Artist: Peter Flanary
- Year: 1990
- Dimensions: 460 cm × 89 cm × 190 cm (180 in × 35 in × 75 in)
- Location: Milwaukee; 43°04′45″N 87°52′57.21″W

Float is a public artwork by American artist Peter Flanary located on the campus of the University of Wisconsin–Milwaukee in front of Sandburg Hall, which is in Milwaukee, Wisconsin, United States.

== Description ==
The sculpture is nestled into a deep ravine and takes advantage of the topography of the land. Float plays with the weight of materials and combines a bronze structure of a canoe with the heavy granite stone. The piece is approximately 15 feet high and barely rises to the level of the sidewalk leading to Sandburg Hall.

Float was purchased with $25,000 that was set aside for artwork during the building of Sandburg Hall. The artist originally meant for the piece to feature a cart with an anvil on top and a star reigning over. Sandburg Hall's architect thought that this design demonstrated a communist ideal and forced Flanary to come up with something else.

Float is currently property of the University of Wisconsin Milwaukee and its students.

== Artist ==
Peter Flanary grew up in the Milwaukee area, and currently has a studio in Mineral Point, Wisconsin. Peter Flanary created Float in his studio. He was a part-time lecturer in the art department at the University of Wisconsin-Madison His work frequently incorporates rocks and other environmental objects. His creation process is rarely direct in that "He tries to grasp the space in its complexity and wants to create something that can be remarked on by people." "He likes material and form and works to have his piece support and work in its environment, growing out of, rather than intruding into the landscape."
