= Chamosite =

Iron-rich end member of the chlorite group

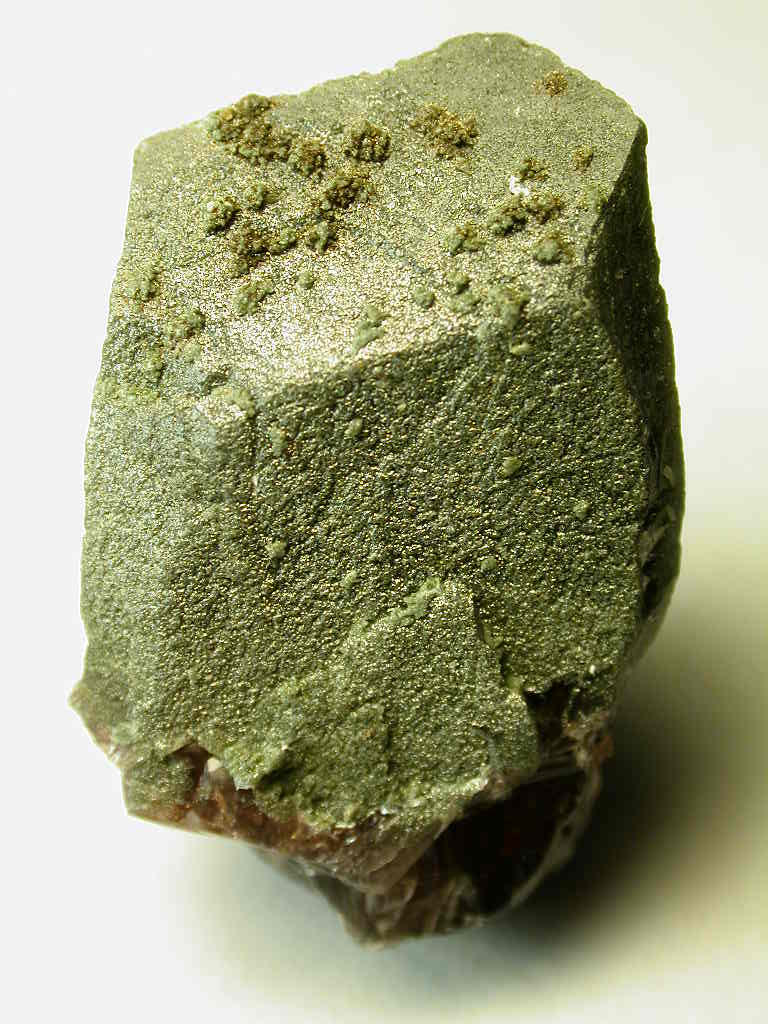
- A 3.6 by 2.2 cm of Axinite-Fe covered on both sides by greenish microcrystals of Chamosite

General
- Category: Phyllosilicate minerals
- Group: Chlorite group
- Formula: (Fe^{2+},Mg)_{5}Al(AlSi_{3}O_{10})(OH)_{8}
- IMA symbol: Chm
- Strunz classification: 9.EC.55
- Crystal system: Monoclinic
- Crystal class: Prismatic (2/m) (same H-M symbol)
- Space group: C2/m
- Unit cell: a = 5.37 Å, b = 9.3 Å, c = 14.22 Å; β = 97.88°; Z = 2

Identification
- Color: Green, grey-green, black
- Mohs scale hardness: 3

Chamosite is the Fe^{2+} end member of the chlorite group. A hydrous aluminium silicate of iron, which is produced in an environment of low-to-moderate-grade metamorphosed iron deposits, as grey or black crystals in oolitic iron ore. Like other chlorites, it is a product of the hydrothermal alteration of pyroxenes, amphiboles and biotite in igneous rock. The composition of chlorite is often related to that of the original igneous mineral, so that more Fe-rich chlorites are commonly found as replacements of the Fe-rich ferromagnesian minerals (Deer et al., 1992).

== History ==
In 1820, Pierre Bertier, a mineralogist and mining engineer from Nemours, France, discovered chamosite. The new mineral was found in an area of low-to-moderate-grade metamorphosed iron deposits. Early samples of chamosite (which is a chlorite) stirred some controversy after they were found to possess the structure of kaolin rather than chlorite; however, further research proved that chamosite was found in nature largely alongside another phyllosilicate called berthierine, which has a kaolin-type structure and is rather difficult to distinguish from chamosite. Chamosite is named after the municipality of Chamoson, between Sion and Martigny, in the canton of Valais, Switzerland.

== Structure ==
X-ray diffraction (XRD) indicates that the proportion of 7 Å B layers in bertherine-chamosite ranges from 5 to 28%, and chemical analysis by scanning electron microscope-energy-dispersive X-ray spectroscopy (SEM-EDS) indicates positive correlation between %B and Fe/(Fe + Mg) (Ryan and Hillier, 2002). The chamosite structure is very similar to that of typical chlorite, in which the layers are regularly alternated between tetrahedral and tri-octahedral components (Rivas Sanchez et al., 2006). Its 2:1 layer structure is similar to that of mica, with a basal spacing of 14 Å. (Rivas Sanchez et al., 2006). In most common chlorites, there are 12.0 octahedral cations per O_{20}(OH)_{16} and approximately equivalent amounts of aluminium in tetrahedral and octahedral sites [e.g. the magnesia chlorite, clinochlore, (Mg_{10}Al_{2})(Si_{6}Al_{2}O_{20})(OH)_{16}] (Deer et al., 1992).

Berthierine, a phyllosilicate mineral of the serpentine subgroup, is challenging to distinguish from chlorite in XRD spectra when both minerals are present in the same sample. They share the same 7 Å peak, but berthierine lacks the 14 Å peak. When chamosite is also present, it overlaps the berthierine XRD spectrum, and the presence of the 14 Å peak does not allow for the identification of berthierine. Berthierine (a 7 Å Fe-rich clay) is hard to identify with standard XRD because a chlorite peak often obscures its lack of a 14 Å basal reflection.

== Physical properties ==
Chamosite has a laminar shape; sheets measure 20-200 μm (Rivas Sanchez et al., 2006). Chamosite may be greenish-grey or brown. The cleavage is length-slow; the orientation may be α ∧ c=small, β=b, γ ∧ α=small, optic plane= [0 10] (Heinrich, 1965) and has good cleavage on the {001} axis. It has a dull luster and greyish-green streak. Birefringence is much lower than that of the micas, illite, montmorillonite and vermiculite, and refractive indices are higher than those of kaolinite (Deer et al. 1992). The chamosite spectra show the reflection d=7.18 Å (principal value of the chlorite) and the reflection d=14.4 Å (which confirms the presence of chlorite) (Rivas Sanchez et al., 2006).

== Geologic occurrence ==
Chamosite is a relatively uncommon mineral in nature. Since its discovery in Chamoson, only about 15 localities worldwide are known to be associated with iron deposits. Chamosite can be found in association with other phyllosilicate minerals from the chlorite and the kaolinite-serpentine groups. In recent years, berthierine, a more abundant Fe-silicate (7 Å Fe-rich clays) from the kaolinite-serpentine group, was discovered in occurrence with chamosite in the iron deposit of Peña Colorada, Mexico. Chamosite is related to the beginning of a hydrothermal phase. It occurs mainly in a mineralized breccia type stock-work in which it fills open spaces and replaces the hot rock through fissures (Rivas Sanchez et al., 2006). The Mamu-Nkporo formation in the locality of Okigwe, Nigeria, was studied by Akande and Mucke (1993), and they concluded that the carbonate discovered with associated chamosite was formed in a shallow marine subtidal to intertidal environment developed during periods of rise and fall in sea level. Formations of chamosite-bearing oolites record periods of increasing wave energy, corresponding to storm conditions, between quiet shallow-marine sedimentation (Akande and Mucke, 1993). Chamosite is a mineral from which elements may be extracted for commercial purposes. Xuanwei City in Yunnan Province has one of the highest lung cancer mortality rates in China (Dai et al., 2008). This epidemic had long been blamed on hydrocarbons released from the burning of coal. Dai et al. (2008) conducted a mineralogical and geochemical study of coal from two coal mines in this region and identified chamosite as one of the main minerals in the coal. The chamosite was suspected as the main carcinogen for the local high lung cancer incidence in Xuanwei.
