= Gowganda Formation =

Geologic formation in Northern Ontario

- Stratigraphic range: Siderian period, Paleoproterozoic Era: c.2300 Ma
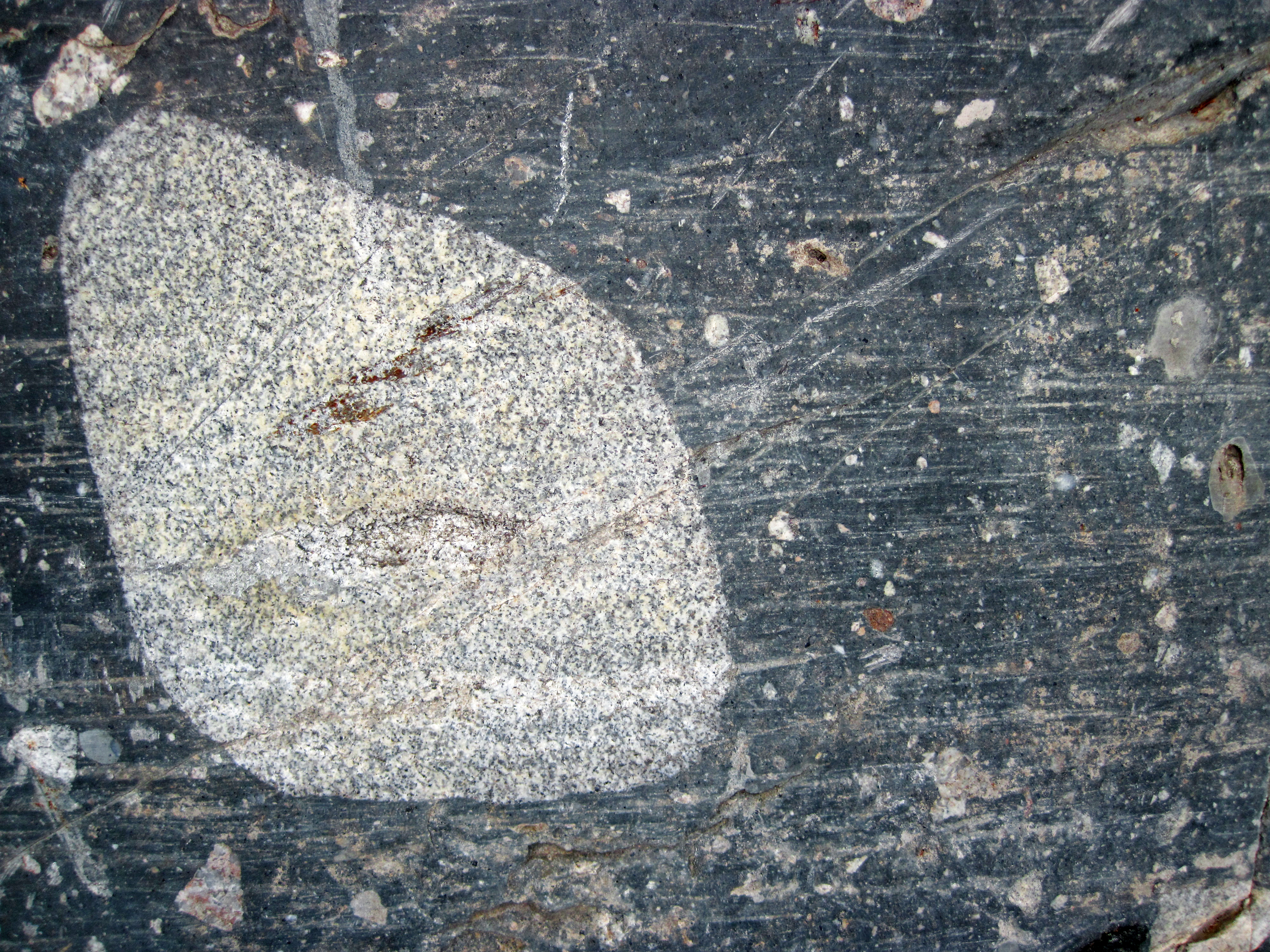
- Gowganda tillite smoothed and striated by more recent glaciation, on a roadcut by Highway 11 south of Latchford, Ontario. (Note: 47°17′32.8″N 79°47′29.2″W)
- Type: Geological formation
- Unit of: Huronian Supergroup
- Thickness: > 1 km

Type section
- Named for: Gowganda, Ontario

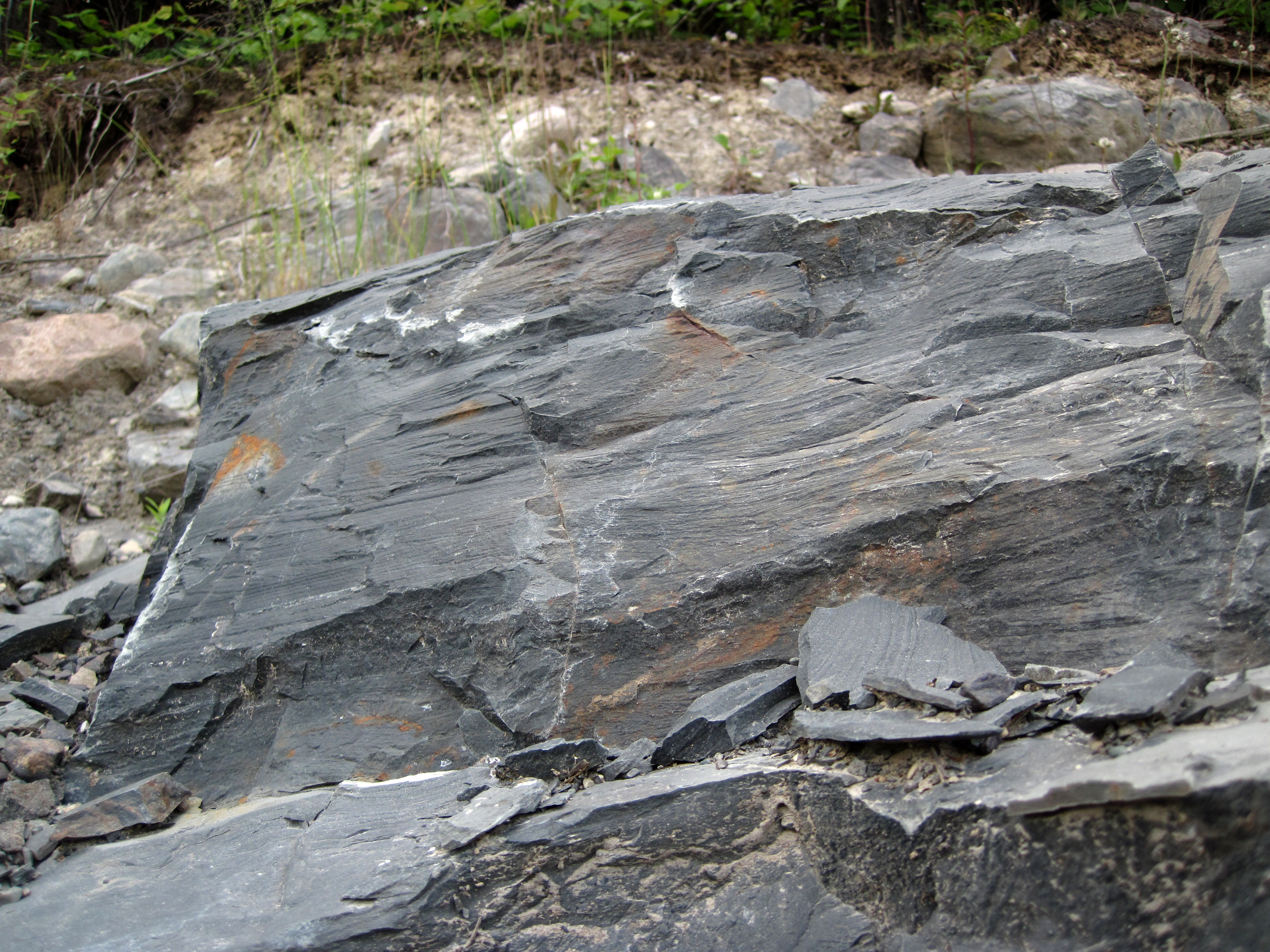
Argillite near Straight Lake, north of Latchford

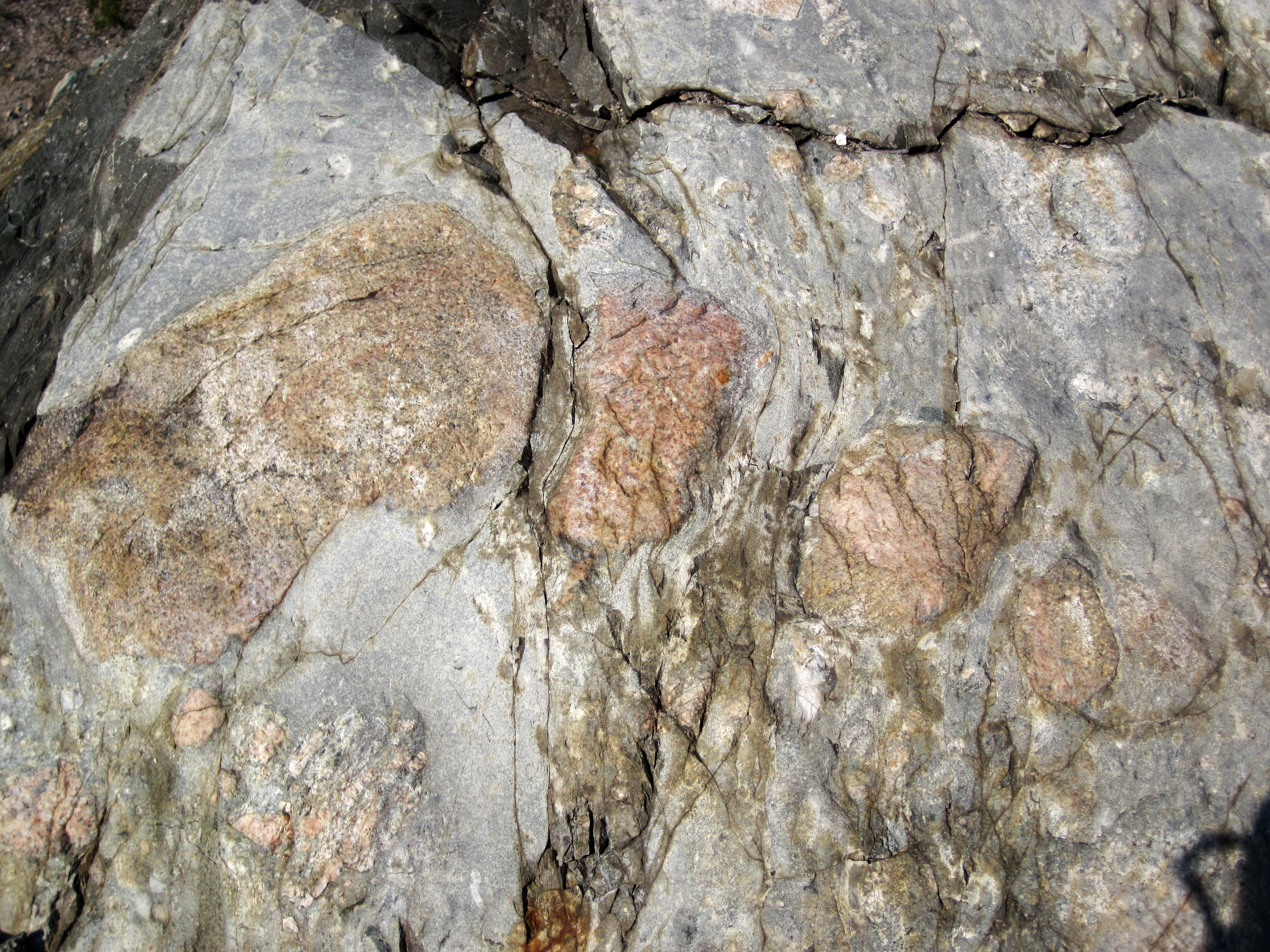
Clast-rich diamictite near Percival Lake

The Gowganda Formation is a large geological formation of glacial deposits in the Huronian Supergroup of Northern Ontario, Canada. The rocks are about 2.3 billion years old, dating to the Paleoproterozoic era, and over a kilometre thick. Gowganda is characterized by diamictite or conglomerate with dropstones and clasts in sedimentary matrices such as mudstone and argillite. It is visible through rock outcrops and road cuts from New Liskeard to the Elliot Lake area, including along parts of Highway 17 north of the North Channel. In the north, the formation lies on a basement of the Archean eon, while the southern parts lie irregularly, and in parts penetrate, a formation of Paleoproterozoic sandstone.

== History of study and significance ==
The formation was first studied by Arthur Philemon Coleman, who discovered it in 1905. Coleman believed the rocks to be glacial in origin, as did WIlliam H. Collins and Morley E. Wilson: till-like conglomerate, striated rock, and the existence of laminated greywacke studded with small dropstones provided evidence of this. Some 1920s papers conversely suggested that the rocks were actually alluvial fans. In the mid 20th century, the formation's origin was again questioned after research into turbidity flows and submarine slumps. A 1969 paper by David A. Lindsey provided "compelling" evidence that the formation is glaciogenic, citing distinctively glacial characteristics such as a small number grooved or striated rocks running parallel to known glacial markings and movements, stones with fractures potentially caused by repeated freezing and thawing, and stones likely brought by ice rafting. Lindsey attributed the relatively small number of striations to the hardness of the rocks. Smaller stones with striations or signs of faceting are also rarely found, which he attributed both to the practical difficulty of removing such stones from the matrix and the fact that "most of the stones are resistant plutonic rocks that do not abrade readily."

The formation is widely considered the world's "most well-preserved and best-exposed Paleoproterozoic glaciogenic deposit" and is among the planet's oldest glacial deposits. It is the most widespread glacial deposit in the Huronian supergroup, and is closely related to the nearby, smaller Ramsey Lake and Bruce formations.

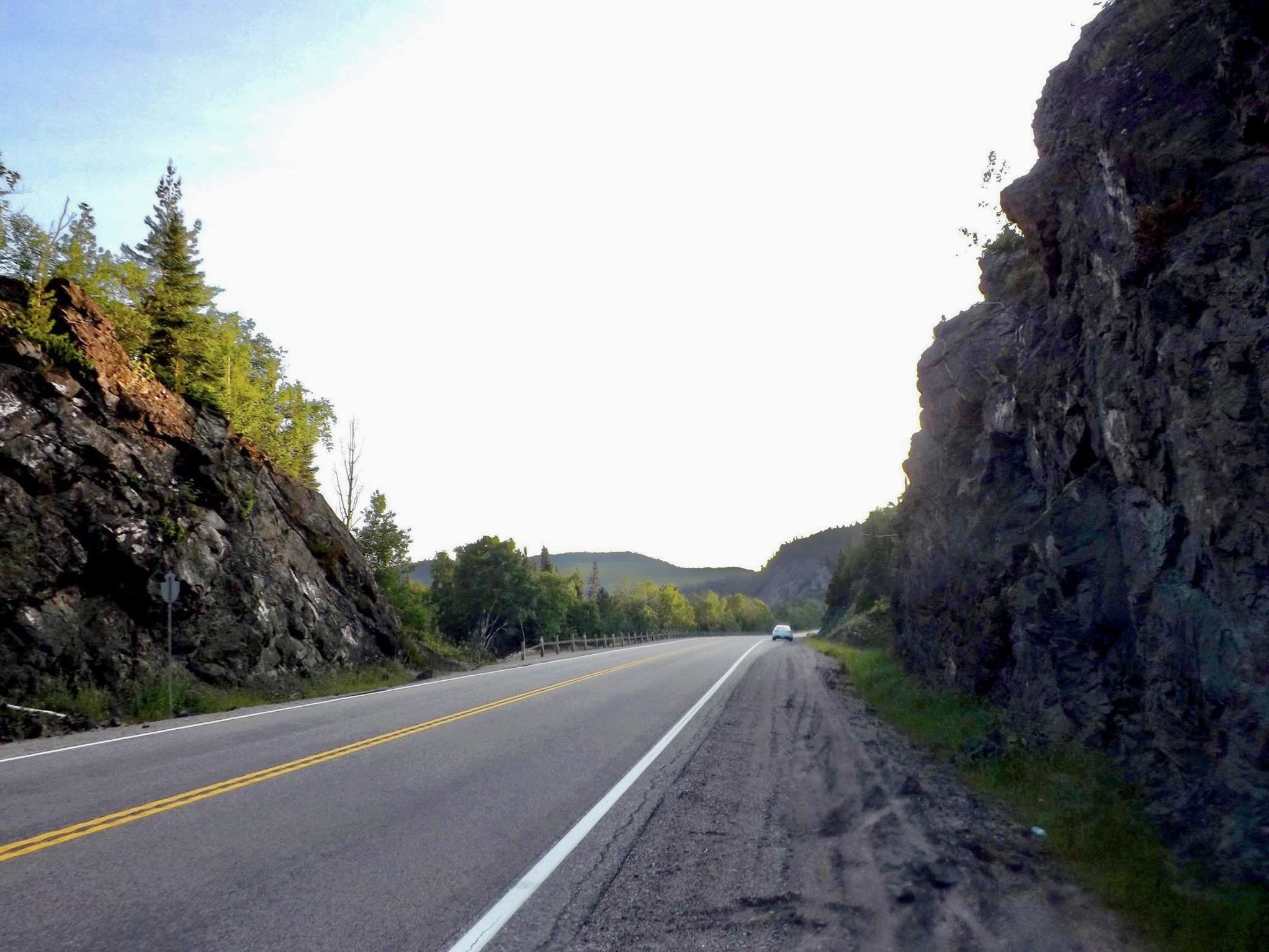
Outcrops and roadcuts along Highway 17 in Algoma: rocks of the Gowganda formation are visible in outcrops such as these further east.

== Location ==
The Gowaganda Formation is situated in a very large area north of Lake Huron, mainly in the Cobalt Plain area but also westwards to the vicinity of Flack Lake in Mississagi Provincial Park. There are Gowganda sites as far north as New Liskeard, and several outcrops are visible from Highway 17 between Espanola and Thessalon, and on other, smaller highways in the region. Gowganda characteristically includes thick areas of diamictite and granite-rich conglomerates. The formation is revealed at surface level through numerous natural outcrops, as well through roadcuts.

The northern reaches of the formation sit directly on a basement dating to the Archean eon, while southern parts rest on sandstones belonging to the Paleoproterozoic Serpent Formation. The interface between the Gowganda and Serpent formations is irregular, with some dykes from Gowganda entering the lower sandstone; it is considered likely that the Serpent formation had not finished lithifying and compacting when the Gowganda formation was deposited on top of it.

== Composition ==
Boyd MacKean, in a 1967 report, described three different members comprising the Gowganda Formation, though he noted that due in part to the heterogenous nature of the formation, that "at best, the subdivision of the Gowganda Formation into mappable units or members is arbitrary." According to MacKean, the formation's lowest member is mainly heterogenous greywacke banded with arkose and even conglomerate. Towards the top of the formation is a member of banded siltstone, sometimes described as "slaty greywacke", with fine grey and reddish bands an inch wide or less. The conglomerate member is also found towards the top of the formation.

Gowganda outcrops include several notable facies, most importantly clast-rich, poorly sorted conglomerate or diamictite, usually with a mud matrix. These were formed when loose rocks of various sizes carried by a large ice sheet calved into icebergs and were embedded into the muddy seafloor. They are considered the "classic" Gowganda facies, and are abundant. Clasts are, however, generally cobble-sized or smaller. Other facies found in Gowganda include highly asymmetric, rippling bedforms; sandstone interbedded with diamictite, probably originating as turbidite; and alternating laminae of sandstone and mudstone, sometimes with large glacier-carried clasts, sometimes interpreted as varvite recording environmental changes. In some areas there is also laminated argillite with dropstones, as well as pink arkose.

Clasts usually make up between 30% and 40% of Gowganda diamictite; the clasts themselves are mainly (80%) pieces of igneous granitoid, followed by other igneous rocks (15% to 20%), with the small remainder being sedimentary.
