= Turee Creek Group =

Geologic group in Western Australia

- Stratigraphic range: Siderian - Rhyacian; ~2449–2310 Ma
- Type: Group
- Unit of: Mount Bruce Supergroup
- Sub-units: Anthiby Formation; Munder Formation; Kazput Formation; Koolbye Formation; Kungarra Formation
- Underlies: (Unconformably) Wyloo Group
- Overlies: Hamersley Group
- Thickness: 4 km (2.5 mi)

Lithology
- Primary: Siltstone
- Other: Sandstone, Diamictite, Dolomite, Chert

Location
- Region: Western Australia
- Country: Australia

Type section
- Named for: Turee Creek Basin
- Named by: McLeod et al.
- Year defined: 1963, elevated in 1979

The Turee Creek Group is a Siderian aged geologic group in Western Australia, and is a part of the wider Mount Bruce Supergroup. Roughly dated to between 2449 - 2310 Ma, and potentially into the Rhyacian at 2209 Ma, it is composed of a range of sedimentary rocks such as sandstone and mudstone, and also contains a number of microfossils communities, some of which are considered to be amongst the oldest known.

== History of research ==
Prior to its elevation to a geologic group, the Turee Creek Group was originally referred to as the "Turee Creek Formation", being named as such in 1963 by McLeod et al., and deriving its name from the Turee Creek Basin. The Turee Creek Formation would later be elevated to the "Turee Creek Group" in 1979 by Trundell.

== Geology ==
The Turee Creek Group is composed of up to five formations. The basal-most formation within the group is the Kungarra Formation, which is predominately composed of thin- to thick-bedded sandstones, and contains two formal members, the "Calgra Member" and "Meteorite Bore Member". This is then overlain by the Koolbye Formation, which is the thinnest, and is primarily composed of fine- to coarse-grained quartzitic sandstones. Overlying the Koolbye Formation is the Kazput Formation, which is composed of mudstones, siltstones, sandstones, as well as dolomites, limestone, and diamictite. Unconformably overlying this formation is the Munder Formation, which is predominately composed of medium- to very-coarse-grained ferruginous sandstone and minor conglomerates. And finally, at the top of the group can be found the Anthiby Formation, which also unconformably overlies the Munder Formation beneath it, and is primarily composed of planar-laminated siltstones and mudstones, which contain minor intecalated fine-grained sandstones. The group itself is unconformably overlain by the basalt composed Wyloo Group, whilst it is conformably underlain by the banded iron dominated Hamersley Group. Alongside the latter group, the Turee Creek Group is a part of the Mount Bruce Supergroup.

== Dating ==
Through U-Pb dating of zircon samples collected from the base and top of the group, the group was confidentially placed into the Siderian period, although its true deposition age is still contended.

Zircon samples from the base of the group recovered a date of 2449±3 Ma, whilst samples from the top of the group recovered a date of 2209±15 Ma. Although, other studies have put forward other dates, for example in 2017, a deposition date of 2445±0 Ma – 2420±0 Ma was recovered from zircon crystals based on Detrital zircon geochronology, hinting at a general maximum deposition age of 2400±0 Ma when combining all the dates. Later studies would recover a minimum deposition age of the group at 2310 Ma, based on samples recovered from the overlying Beasley River Quartzite, which would see the whole group span from the Siderian into the Rhyacian.

== Fossils ==
The Turee Creek Group contains a small number of important fossil localities, although the exact placement of a majority of these localities in relations to the formal formations remains difficult to figure out, but some studies note that even then all researchers agree that the following localities are within the Turee Creek Group.

=== Kazput Reef Complex ===
The Turee Creek Group is home to many stromatolites and thrombolites, with the most well known stromatolite–thrombolite locality being in the Kazput Syncline. This locality, known as the "Kazput Reef Complex" and only discovered in 2016, is composed of a 350 m (1,150 ft) thick and 15 km (9.3 mi) long dolomitic microbialite reef complex, which has been purposed to be a part of either the upper Kazput Formation or lower Kungarra Formation, with the latter seeming more likely in recent studies. Dating of the area has recovered a date between 2400±0 Ma – 2300±0 Ma, which would make the Kazput Reef Complex the oldest known Proterozoic reef complex yet, predating previous examples by some 300±0 Ma – 500±0 Ma.

The Kazput Reef Complex contains up to five distinct facies associations, which are as follows, in ascending age:

- Association A: The basal-most facies of the reef complex, it is composed of thin-bedded dololutite–dolarenite, and contains abundant local stromatolites, which are dome-like in shape. It can get up to 55 m (180 ft) thick in known outcroppings, as the lower sections are not exposed.
- Association B: This facies is primarily composed of more thin-bedded dololutite–dolarenite, in which there are inter-bedded columnar and strati-form stromatolites, thin-bedded thrombolite-like microbialites, and unique horizontally branching stromatolites throughout, which were all deposited in a shallow marine environment. Oncolite beds can also be found within this facies up to 29 cm (11.4 in) thick, with the facies itself getting up to 85 m (279 ft) thick also.
- Association C: This facies is predominately composed of tightly packed club-shaped to columnar stromatolites, which were deposited in deeper waters, deepening the further up you go. This facies can get up to 90 m (300 ft) thick.
- Association D: This facies is dominated by microbialites, which have a unique clotted structure. It is also the thinnest, only getting up to 40 m (130 ft) in some sections.
- Association E: This top-most facies is mostly composed of more bedded dololutite–dolarenite, as well as thin-bedded ironstone, grey shale and black chert. It is also the thickest facies, getting up to 150 m (490 ft) thick in some areas. This facies also contains a number of microfossils embedded within the black chert layers, numbering up to eighteen distinct morphologies, and two distinct microfossil communities.

=== Microfossils ===
Within the Kazput Reef Complex, microfossils of varying shapes and sizes had been also recovered, numbering up to eighteen distinct morphotypes, two of which were previously unknown, and gave evidence to the fact that microbial communities were already quickly diversifying after the end of the Archean. These microfossils can be split into two distinct communities, which are as follows:

- Nodular Black Cherts: This microfossil community is primarily composed of long filamentous microfossils, filamentous rosettes, unicellular forms of one size distribution, and large collapsed spherical aggregates. These were mostly like preserved in-situ, and within a deep water environment.
- Bedded Black Cherts: This microfossil community was found within and around clasts of bedded black cherts, and is predominately composed of more unicellular forms varying in size, short degraded filaments, as well as star-shaped and umbrella-shaped rosettes. Around the clasts there are also large branching filamentous microfossils, with the clasts themselves most likely being transported from somewhere else, likely a shallow water environment, and may represent the oldest phototrophic microfossil community currently known in the world.

== See also ==
Great Oxidation Event
