= Mount Bruce Supergroup =

Geologic supergroup in Western Australia

- Stratigraphic range: Neoarchean - early Paleoproterozoic 2800–2440 Ma
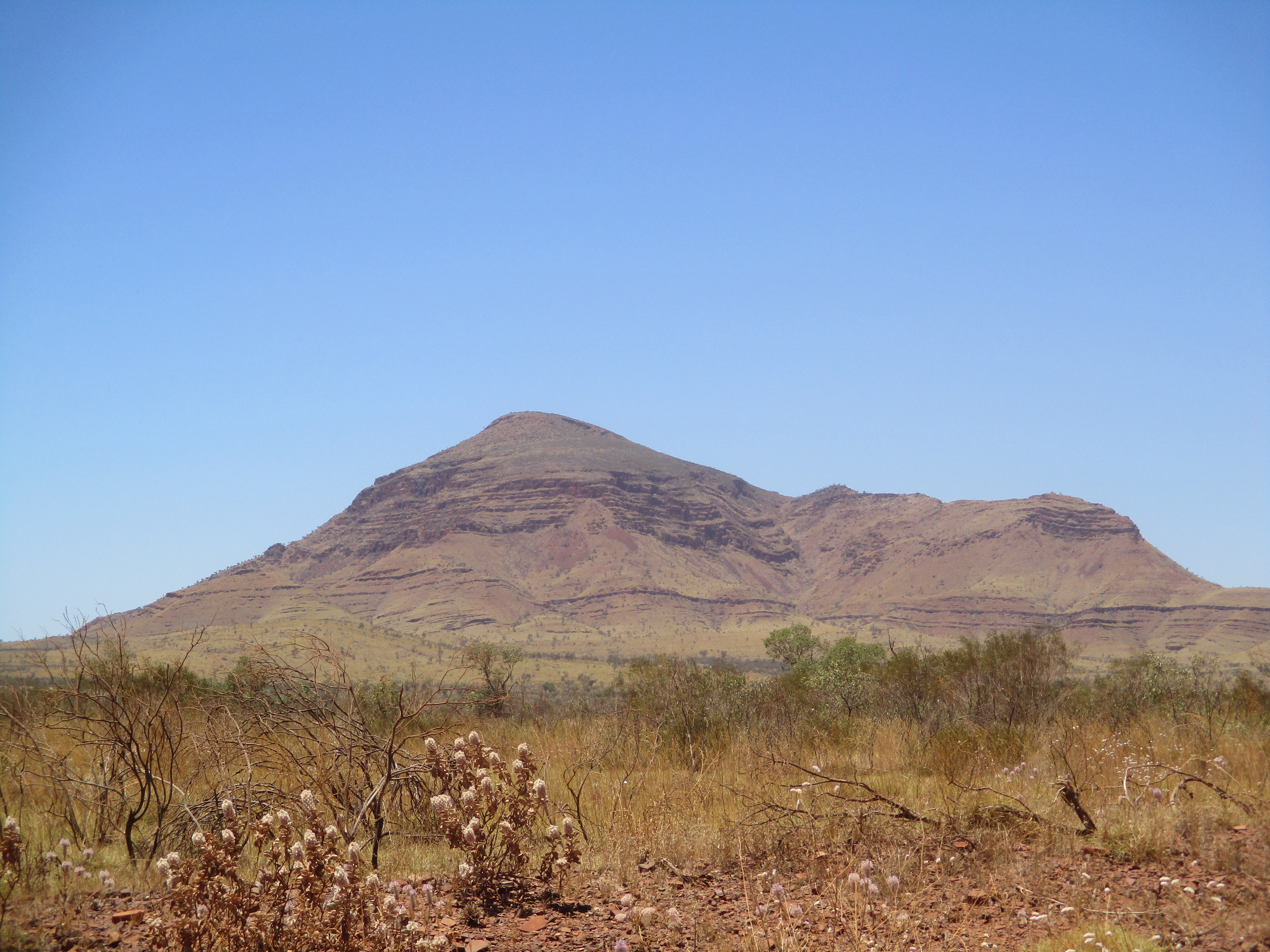
- Mount Bruce in Karijini National Park, the locality after which the formation is named.
- Type: Supergroup
- Sub-units: See: Groups
- Underlies: Wyloo Group (Unconformably)
- Overlies: Pilbara Supergroup (Unconformably)
- Area: 110,000 km^{2} (42,000 sq mi)

Lithology
- Primary: Mafic lava rock
- Other: Banded iron formations, Carbonate rock, Siliciclastic rock

Location
- Coordinates: 22°34′05″S 118°04′34″E
- Region: Western Australia
- Country: Australia

Type section
- Named for: Mount Bruce
- Mount Bruce Supergroup (Australia) Mount Bruce Supergroup (Western Australia)

The Mount Bruce Supergroup, also sometimes known as the Mount Bruce Megasequence, is a geologic supergroup in the Hamersley Range of Western Australia, containing sub-groups and formations ranging from the Archean, into the Siderian, and possibly into the Rhyacian. Some groups and formations within the supergroup also contain fossils.

== Geology ==
The Mount Bruce Supergroup was formed from the collision of two cratons, namely the Pilbara craton and Yilgarn craton, which both form the Western Australian Shield, which the supergroup sits within. This has resulted in the supergroup undergoing various tilting, folding and erosion on large scales, meaning the full extent of the supergroup is primarily now structural, with any remaining depositional outcrops being far and few between, and much less than what is left today.

Due to this, this has further resulted in many disputes over the depositional setting of the supergroup itself, with two known models, primarily for the Hamersley Group. Model one sees the Hamersley Group being deposited within a barred basin, and restricted today to the known outcrops. Meanwhile, model two sees Hamersley Group being deposited on a marine shelf or platform environment.

=== Groups ===
The Mount Bruce Supergroup contains three formal groups, which are as follows, in ascending stratigraphic order (lowest to highest). Formations are also listed in stratigraphic order:

==== Fortescue Group ====
The Fortescue Group is the largest group, with up to nine formations. At the base of the group in the Southern Craton, it is primarily composed of a small tilted layer of tuffaceous sediments, mafic lava and felsic volcanic rocks, making up the Bellary Formation. Above this is the Mount Roe Basalt, which is predominately composed of subaerial mafic lava rock. Both these formations form the Mount Joe Sequence. Higher up is the thickest formation, the Hardey Formation, and like the Bellary formation, is composed of tuffaceous sediments, and various mafic and felsic rocks. It is also contained in its own sequence, the Hardey Sequence Package, and unconformably overlies the formations within the Southern Craton. All the prior named sequences come together to form the Nullangine Supersequence.

Above the Hardey Formation is the Boongal Formation, which is primarily composed of subaqueous mafic lava rock, and resides in its own sequence, that being the Kylena Sequence. On top of this, there is then the thin Pyradie Formation, predominately composed of subaqueous tuffs, mafic lava rock, spinifex-textured basalt, and layers of komatiite, and is a part of the Tumbiana Sequence. Then, higher up, is the Bunjinah Formation, which sees the return of the subaqueous mafic lava rock, and is a part of the Maddina Sequence Package. All prior sequences form to make the Mount Roe Supersequence. And finally, the last formation in the Southern Craton is the Jeerinah Formation, which is primarily composed of mudrocks, and is contained in the Marra Mamba Supersequence Package.

The Fortescue Group can also be found outcropping in the Northern and Eastern Cratons of the Mount Bruce Supergroup, with differences beginning above the Hardey Formation within those regions. Unconformably overlying the Hardey Formation here is the Kylena Basalt, which is primarily composed of subaerial mafic lava rock, and is a part of the Kylena Sequence. Overlying this formation is the Tumbiana Formation, which is predominately composed of pyroclastic and reworked mafic tuffs, and is a part of the Tumbiana Sequence. Above this sees the return of subaerial mafic lava rocks in the Maddina Basalt of the Maddina Sequence Package, which is unconformably overlain by the mudrocks of the Jeerinah Formation.

==== Hamersley Group ====
The Hamersley Group is the thinnest of the three, with up to eight formations within it, and are all confined to the Southern Craton, excluding one. At the base of this group is the Marra Mamba Iron Formation, which as the name suggests, is a banded iron formation. Above this is then the Wittenoom Formation, which is predominately composed carbonate sedimentary rocks in its lower sections, and mudrock in the upper sections. Within the Northern and Eastern Cratons, there is a single formation of the Hamersley Group, which is the Carawine Dolomite, and as the name suggests, is primarily composed of dolomite rocks. All previous formations are contained within the Marra Mamba Supersequence Package. The Wittenoom Formation is unconformably overlain by the Mount Sylvia Formation and Mount McRae Shale, which is composed of various shales. Above these formations then lay the Brockman Iron Formation, which is primarily composed of banded iron formations. The prior three formations make up the Brockman Supersequence Package. Overlying the Brockmam Iron Formation is the Weeli Wolli Formation, also predominately composed of banded iron formations. Above this is the Woongarra Volcanics, which is composed of felsic volcanic rocks. Both prior formations form the Woongarra Sequence. And finally, at the top of the Hamersely Group is the Boolgeeda Iron Formation, which is primarily composed of banded iron formations, and is a part of the Turee Creek Supersequence.

==== Turee Creek Group ====
The Turee Creek Group is the topmost group, and contains only three formations. The first within the group is the Kungarra Formation, which is primarily composed of siltstone, with a layer of diamictite rock in the upper sections of the formation, which go under the name of the "Meteorite Bore Member". This is overlain by the Koolbye Formation, which is the thinnest of the three, and is predominately composed of sandstone. Finally, the last formation within the group is the Kazput Formation, with dolomite and sandstone at its base, which then turns into just sandstone further towards the top. All formations within this group are contained within the Turee Creek Supersequence. The group is also known to bear various micro and macrofossils.

=== Gravity Anomalies ===
The Mount Bruce Supergroup also contains a gravity anomaly in the northern sections, which has been named the "Fortescue Regional Gravity Complex" in an area of the Pilbara Craton referred to as the "Granite-Greenstone Terrane", or GGT for short, which the supergroup overlies.

== Dating ==
Using U–Pb dating on zircon samples, the lower-most sections of the supergroup have had a date of 2768±16 Ma recovered, placing the base of the supergroup within the early Neoarchean. Meanwhile, zircon samples from the upper-most sections of the supergroup, found within the Turee Creek Group, have also had U–Pb dating done on them, and recovered at date of 2209±15 Ma, which would place the top of the supergroup within the Rhyacian, although other studies have put forward other recovered dates, for example in 2017, a deposition date of 2445±0 Ma – 2420±0 Ma was recovered from zircon crystals based on Detrital zircon geochronology.

=== Supersequence dating ===
The individual supersequences within the supergroup have also been U–Pb dated using zircon samples. The base of the Mount Roe Supersequence, and the top of the Nullagine Supersequence, has had a date of 2715±6 ma, whilst the top of the Mount Roe formation has had a date of 2684±6 ma recovered, placing it within the middle Neoarchean. The base of the Carrawine Supersequence has been roughly dated to 2590±0 ma, placing it within the late Neoarchean, and the Marra Mamba Supersequence below within the middle Neoarchean. The base of the Brockman Supersequence has been dated to between 2543±0 ma – 2499±0 ma, placing it within the late Neoarchean to early Paleoproterozoic, and the Siderian period. And finally, the base of the Turee Creek Supersequence has been dated to roughly 2452±0 ma, which would place the supersequence within the middle to late Siderian.

== Fossils ==
The Mount Bruce Supergroup is home to some of the oldest known stromatolite–thrombolite reef complexes, alongside two distinct microfossil communities, one of which are also the oldest known phototrophic microfossil community, All of which are found within the lower sections of the Turee Creek Group, although the exact formation they are a part of remains unknown.

Molecular fossils have also been found within the Archean sections of the supergroup, namely within the Fortescue and Hamersley Groups, predating the previously oldest known material from the McArthur Group of Australia by 1100±0 ma. Alongside this, various stromatolites and similar structures outside of the reef complexes have also been found throughout the supergroup, ranging from columnar to domical in shape.
