= Orosirian =

Third period of the Paleoproterozoic Era

- 2050 – 1800 Ma
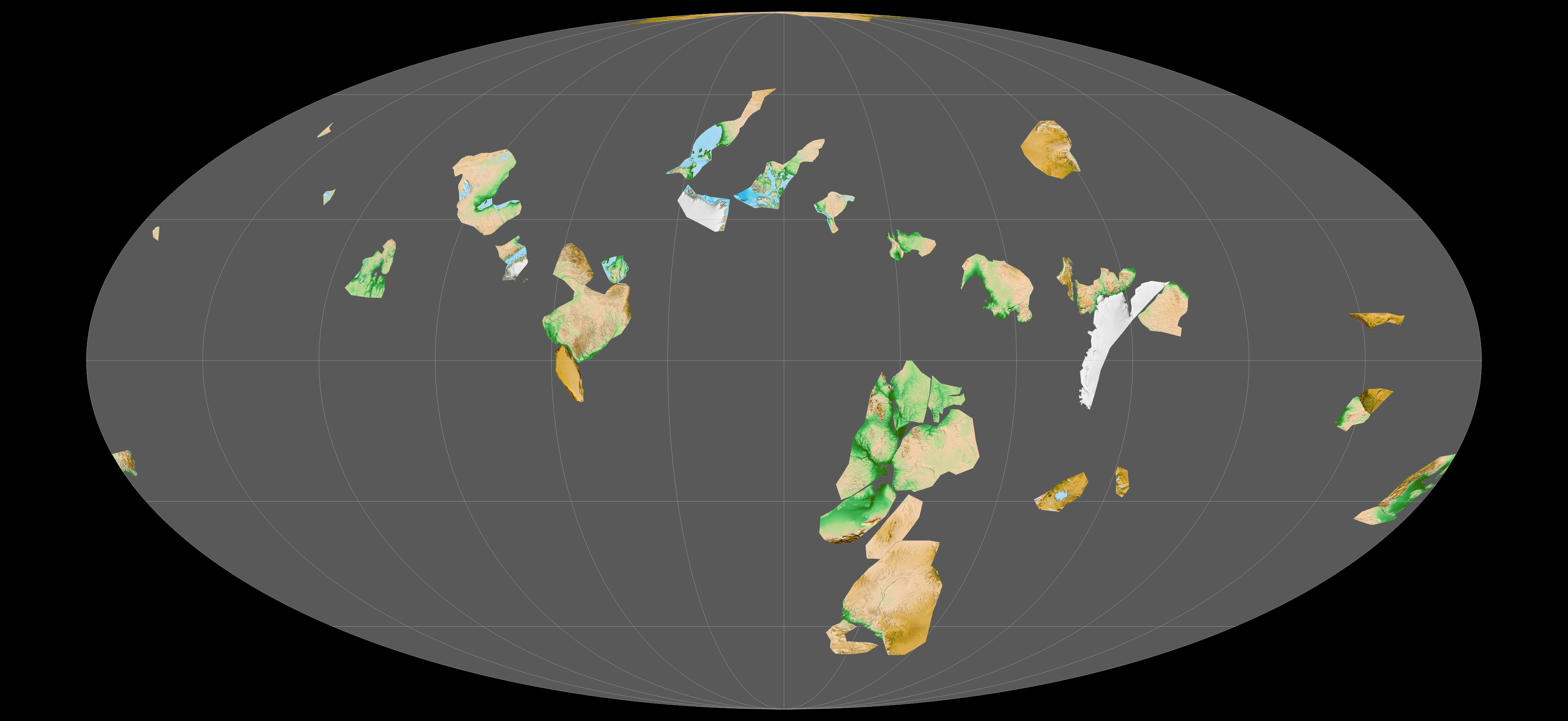
- A map of Earth as it appeared during the early Orosirian, c. 2 Ga

Chronology
| ← / Beginning of the Boring Billion; ← / Supercontinent Columbia forms; ← / Sudbury Basin structure created by asteroid impact?; ← / End of the Great Oxidation Event; ← / Vredefort impact structure created by asteroid impact |
Events of the Orosirian Period; Vertical axis scale: Millions of years ago

Etymology
- Name formality: Formal

Usage information
- Celestial body: Earth
- Regional usage: Global (ICS)
- Time scale(s) used: ICS Time Scale

Definition
- Chronological unit: Period
- Stratigraphic unit: System
- Time span formality: Formal
- Lower boundary definition: Defined chronometrically
- Lower GSSA ratified: 1990
- Upper boundary definition: Defined chronometrically
- Upper GSSA ratified: 1990

The Orosirian ( /ˌɒroʊˈsɪəriən/; Ancient Greek: ὀροσειρά, romanized: oroseirá, meaning "mountain range") is the third geologic period in the Paleoproterozoic Era. It spans 250 million years and lasted from 2050 to 1800 million years ago (Ma), following the Rhyacian Period and preceding the Statherian Period. Instead of being based on stratigraphy, these dates are defined chronometrically.

== History ==
For the time period from about 2060 to 1780 Mya, an alternative period based on stratigraphy rather than chronometry, named the Columbian, was suggested in the geological timescale review 2012 edited by Gradstein et al., but as of February 2022, this has not yet been officially adopted by the IUGS.

== Paleogeography ==
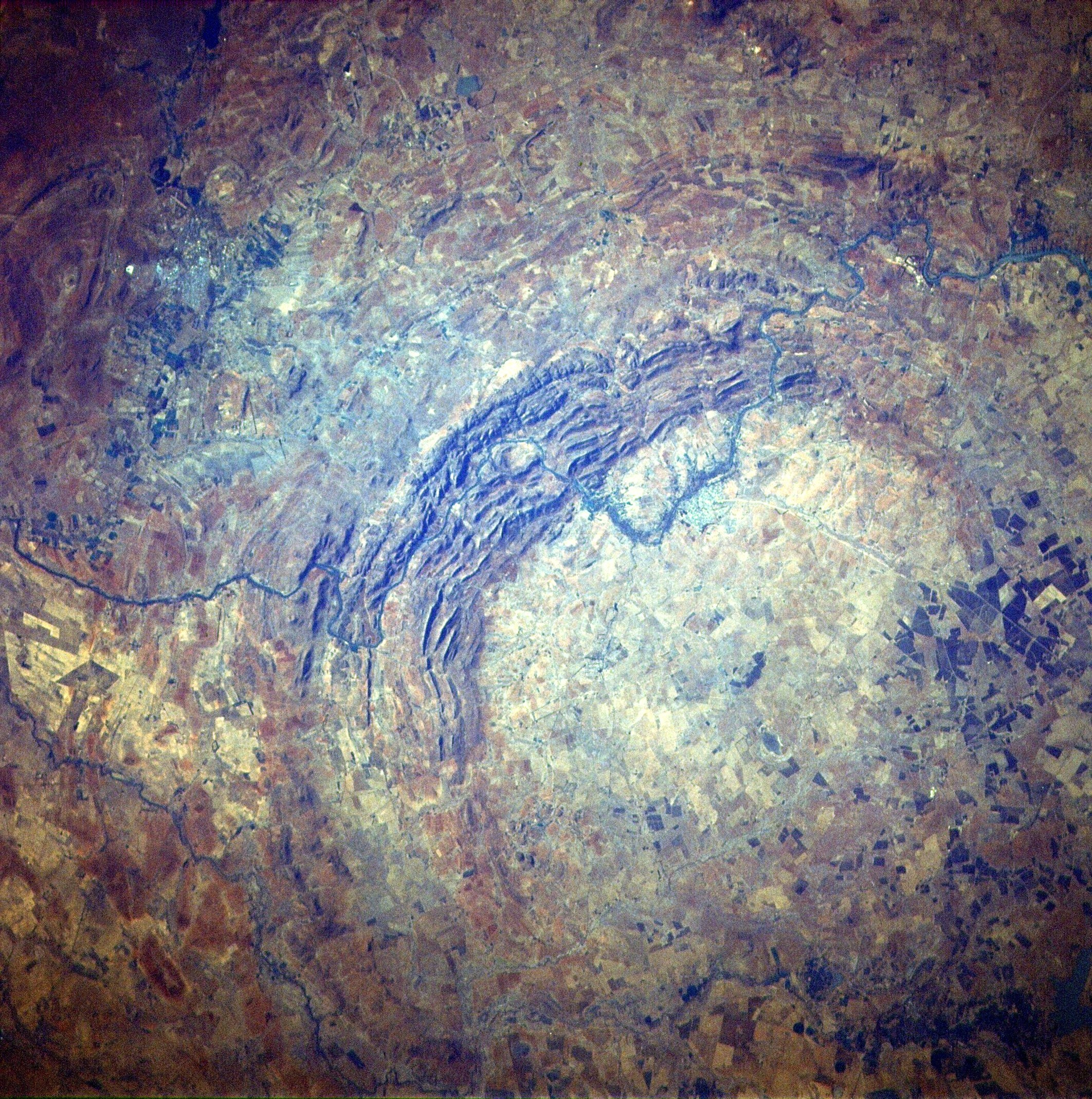
Vredefort impact structure is believed to have formed in this period

Two of the largest known impact events on Earth occurred during the Orosirian. Early in the period, 2023 Mya, a large asteroid collision created the Vredefort impact structure. The event that created the Sudbury Basin structure occurred near the end of the period, 1850 Mya.

The later half of the period was an episode of intensive orogeny on virtually all continents.

The supercontinent Columbia may have formed at the end of this period.
