= Kungarra Formation =

Geologic formation in Western Australia

- Stratigraphic range: Siderian; ~2449 Ma
- Type: Formation
- Unit of: Turee Creek Group
- Sub-units: Meteorite Bore Member
- Underlies: Koolbye Formation
- Overlies: Boolgeeda Iron Formation
- Thickness: ~2,000 m (6,600 ft)

Lithology
- Primary: Siltstone
- Other: Diamictite, Shale

Location
- Coordinates: 22°50′48″S 116°52′12″E
- Region: Western Australia
- Country: Australia

Type section
- Named by: Trendall
- Year defined: 1979
- Kungarra Formation (Australia) Kungarra Formation (Western Australia)

The Kungarra Formation is an Siderian aged geologic formation in Western Australia. Dated to roughly 2449 Ma, with a potential minimum depositional date of 2208 Ma, the formation is predominately composed of siltstone rocks, and possibly contains a Stromatolite reef complex as well as a microfossil assemblage, although there have been notable difficulties in placing it within this formation, as well as the other candidate Kazput Formation.

== Geology ==
The Kungarra Formation can be found outcropping within the Turee Creek Group, reaching up to around ~2,000 m (6,600 ft) thick and is composed predominately of siltstone and fine-grained sandstone, with a singular member in the middle of the formation known as the "Meteorite Bore Member", which is composed of diamictite. It is underlain by the Boolgeeda Iron Formation of the Hamersley Group, whilst it is overlain by the sandstone dominated Koolbye Formation.

=== Members ===
There is only a single named member in the formation, the Meteorite Bore Member. This member in its type section reaches up to 270 m (890 ft) thick, and sits roughly ~1,800 m (5,900 ft) above the base of the Kungarra Formation. It is primarily composed of diamictite and shale. The member was also deposited during a glacial period, primarily at a rapidly melting ice-front, inferred from glacigenic sediment being found restricted to certain areas of the member as well as various clasts, and the distinct lack of evidence of an ice shelf or large icebergs.

== Fossils ==
The Kungarra Formation is possibly home to the Kazput Reef Complex, a large stromatolite–thrombolite reef discovered in 2016, which also contains possibly the oldest phototrophic microfossil community known. Although, the exact position of this reef complex remains up in the air, with it being attributed also to the upper sections of the Kazput Formation originally, hence its name. Despite this, recent studies have supported a placement within the lower sections of the Kungarra Formation.
