= Tumbiana Formation =

Geological formation in Western Australia

- Stratigraphic range: early Neoarchean; ~2727–2715 Ma
- Type: Formation
- Unit of: Fortescue Group
- Sub-units: See: Members
- Underlies: (Unconformably) Kylena Formation
- Overlies: Maddina Formation
- Thickness: 100–500 m (330–1,640 ft)

Lithology
- Primary: Limestone
- Other: Siliciclastics

Location
- Region: Western Australia
- Country: Australia
- Extent: 680 km (420 mi) across

Type section
- Named for: Tumbinna Pool
- Named by: Lipple, S.L.
- Year defined: 1975

The Tumbiana Formation, previously referred to as the Tumbiana Pisolite, is an early Neoarchean aged geological formation in Western Australia. Dated to roughly between 2727 - 2715 Ma, the formation was deposited within a carbonate-rich lacustrine environment, and is fossiliferous in nature, containing organic-walled microfossils.

== History of research ==
Prior to a its formal description, the rocks of the formation would first be described as the "Tumbinna Pisolite" in 1962 by Noldart and Wyatt, taking its name from the nearby Tumbinna Pool along the Nullagine River. For an unknown reason, this named would be changed to the "Tumbiana Pisolite" a year later in 1963 by de la Hunty, which has stuck ever since, even during the elevation to a formation. A few attempts have been made to return the name back to its original spelling. The formation would be downgraded to being a member of the "Mount Jope Volcanics" in 1966 by MacLeod and de la Hunty. In 1967, it would only be mapped by Kriewaldt and Ryan as the "Pillingini Tuff", which was repeated by Williams in 1968. The formation would be formalised as the "Tumbiana Formation" in 1975 by Lipple, although the name had been used informally a year prior by Hickman in 1974.

The members of the formation would also be described by Lipple as the "Mingah Tuff Member" and "Meentheena Carbonate Member". The "Carbonate" from the Meentheena Carbonate Member would be dropped in 1998 by Thorne and Hickman, whilst the "Tuff" from the Mingah Tuff Member would be dropped in 2000 by Kojan and Hickman.

== Geology ==
The Tumbiana Formation can be found outcropping across Western Australia, and is a part of the Fortescue Group, which itself is a part of the wider Mount Bruce Supergroup, where it is unconformbaly underlain by the igneous rocks of the Kylena Formation, and overlain by the igneous rocks of the Maddina Formation. The formation itself is primarily composed of siliciclastics and stromatolite-bearing limestones, and is up to 500 m (1,600 ft) thick.

=== Members ===
The Tumbiana Formation is composed of two formal members, which are as follows, in ascending stratigraphic order (lowest to highest):

- Mingah Member: This member is predominately composed of basaltic to andesitic volcanic and volcaniclastic rocks.
- Meentheena Member: This member is primarily composed of stromatolite-bearing limestone and siliciclastic rocks, and ranges between 30–50 m (98–164 ft) in thickness. Throughout the limestones, there can be found flat-pebble conglomerates, oolites, grainstones, calcisiltites, as well as calcilutites. Meanwhile, the siliciclastics rock are composed of shale, siltstone, as well as sandstone, much of which is tuffaceous in nature. This member is the fossiliferous of the two.

== Dating ==
The Tumbiana Formation has been dated using U-Pb dating on zircon samples collected from near the base and top of the formation, as well as radioisotopic dating from the top of the formation. The zircon samples collected from the lower member of the formation yielded a date range of 2727 - 2724 Ma, whilst the radioisotopic studies yielded a date of 2719 Ma, which correlates to the maximum date of 2718 Ma from the overlying Maddina Formation. The zircon samples from the top of the formation lend credence to this, yielding a date of 2721.57 Ma.

== Paleoenvironment ==
The depositional environment of the Tumbiana Formation, and more specifically the Meentheena Member, has been debated over the years, with the current consensus being it was deposited in a lacustrine environment due to the presence of cyclic and abrupt facies changes laterally and vertically, the abundance of symmetrical ripple-marks and the lack of marine sedimentary structures, alongside the cyclically changing strontium isotopic ratios that are noted to be considerably higher than is expected of seawater values, as well as the lack of dolomites, aragonite fans, and cacite seafloor crusts. This would see the Meentheena Member in which the environment is deposited in regarded as the oldest known carbonate-rich, lacustrine system, being referred to as the "Meentheena lakes system". It has previously been considered to be a non-marine environment, as well as a shallow-marine environment.

== Fossils ==
The Tumbiana Formation contains various stromatolites, such as Alcheringa narrina, as well as microfossils, which are predominately found from the middle of the Meentheena Member, being recovered through the use of a core sample. This core sample, referred to as "GSWA-615567", was the only one which yielded acid-resistant specimens, and was composed of organic-rich, finely-laminated calcareous siltstone, with well-sorted quartz, feldspar, and clay mineral clasts, all of which was cemented by calcite.

=== Microfossil morphology ===
As for the specimens themselves, of which there are several fragmented specimens with irregular outlines, and 13 intact specimens, which range between 54–127 μm (0.0021–0.0050 in), and are brownish in colouration and are highly flattened. In the intact specimens, there are two noted morphologies; simple spheroidal, and urn-shaped with a spheroidal body and a protrusion-like structure. This protrusion-like structure has a smooth and seamless connection to the body, thus being a natural extension in life, rather than an artificial attachment to the body as seen in other specimens. All specimens have pronounced thickened rims and wrinkles present, which is noted to likely be the result of the compression of a flexible, hollow vesicle, inferred from the presence of a distinctive separation of the top and bottom layers in one of the specimens, which is not present in others likely due to diagenetic merging of these layers.

=== Microfossil endogenicity, syngeneity, and biogenicity ===
It has been noted that microfossils from the Archean are relatively sparse, either due to being morphologically similar to abiotic minerals around them, or the displacement of amorphous carbon. The only widely accepted Archean microfossils, prior to the discovery of the microfossils of this formation, where from the 2500 Ma Gamohaan Formation of South Africa. Alongside this, other accepted Archean microfossils could be found in the 3200 Ma Moodies Group also in South Africa, and the 3000 Ma Farrel Quartzite in Western Australia. The Tumbiana microfossils fit the established criteria for the assessment of endogenicity, syngeneity, and biogenicity. The endogenicity and syngeneity is noted to be supported by the dark colouration, as well as the flattened state of the microfossils, with folds and thickened rims present. For biogenicity, the evidence of preservation of originally hollow, spheroidal morphology, alongside the considerably large sizes, and natural protusions, go against any argument of the Tumbiana microfossils being artificially accumulated organic particles. The general porous ultrastructure of the microfossils is also similar to what is seen in later Proterozoic organic-walled microfossils, thus suggesting these share comparable features, and further giving credence to the biogenicity of the microfossils. From this, the microfossils are interpreted as the body fossils of extinct microorganisms, which where endogentic and syngenetic to their host rock. Alongside this, these microfossils would increase the number of known Archean microfossils, specially those in lacustrine environments.

=== Microfossil affinities ===
The affinity of the Tumbiana microfossils is stated to likely remain obscure, due to the limited number of features present on the microfossils themselves. It is noted that the generally large sizes, and protrusion-like structures are similar to what is seen in eukaryotic microbes, although these are not features entirely restricted to eukaryotes. Alongside this, the microfossils do not have any preserved trilaminar ultrastructure or complex wall ornamentations. The microfossils are then compared to cyanobacteria, which are known to be preserved as organic-walled microfossils, specially to larger sizes than prokaryotes. They are also noted to be the producers of stromatolites, which are known from the formation, from which carbon isotope signals suggestive of photosynthesis is also known. Although, it is noted that the cyanobacterial affinity is unlikely for the Tumbiana microfossils, due to bacteria also attaining large sizes, and feature a cell-wall construction similar to what is seen in other cyanobacteria. Despite the difficult nature of assignment of an extant group, the microfossils are noted to very likely not represent archaea or methanotrophic bacteria, due to the carbon isotope signals being too low, as well as the generally smaller sizes of the latter two groups when compared to the Tumbiana microfossils. Thus, they either represent some form of cyanobacteria or total-group eukaryotes.
