= William Henry Collins =

Canadian geologist (1878–1937)

- Born: October 26, 1878 near Chatsworth, Ontario, Canada
- Died: January 14, 1937 (aged 58); Ottawa, Ontario, Canada
- Education: University of Toronto; University of Wisconsin–Madison
- Scientific career
- Fields: Geology
- Workplaces: Geological Survey of Canada
- Academic advisors: Arthur Philemon Coleman; Harry Rosenbusch

William Henry Collins (October 26, 1878 – January 14, 1937) was a Canadian geologist. He was educated at the University of Toronto, Heidelberg University, the University of Chicago, and the University of Wisconsin–Madison. His 31-year career with the Geological Survey of Canada included 16 years as Director of the Survey. He was a Fellow of the Royal Society of Canada and served as President of the Society's geological and biological sciences section. He was also President of the Geological Society of America and an elected member of the American Philosophical Society.

== Early life and education ==
Collins was born October 26, 1878, to Ann Deavitt and Henry Meredith Collins, on their farm near Chatsworth, Ontario. His mother was descended from French Huguenots who had settled and developed Chatsworth, and his father was of English descent. He was the oldest of four boys. His mother died when he was 10 years old.

From an early age Collins loved the outdoors, spending much of his free time there. After graduating from the Owen Sound Collegiate Institute he spent a year as principal of the school in Chatsworth. He began a relationship with the teacher of the primary school, Agnes McGill, whom he would later marry.

In 1900 Collins entered the University of Toronto. There he studied geology under Arthur Philemon Coleman and earned a Bachelor of Arts with First Class Honours in 1904. After a year as a research assistant in the Department of Mineralogy, he did graduate studies at Heidelberg University under Harry Rosenbusch, at the University of Chicago, and at the University of Wisconsin–Madison, where he earned his Ph.D. in 1911. The University of Toronto awarded him an honorary Doctor of Science degree in 1936.

== Career ==
In 1906, as he began his graduate studies, Collins joined the Geological Survey of Canada, and remained there until his death in 1937. He spent his first 15 years engaged in field work producing geological maps, mostly of the Canadian Shield, with a particular focus on the Huronian Supergroup. He was known for strong outdoor skills, which aided his expeditions greatly. In 1919 was named a Fellow of the Royal Society of Canada.

In 1920 Collins was named Director of the Geological Survey. In this position he led a project to map all of Canada on a scale of 8 miles to 1 inch. He also incorporated aviation, then a relatively new tool for geologists, into the work of the Survey. He remained Director until 1936, when the Survey was incorporated into the new Department of Mines and Resources. Collins became Chief Geological Consultant to the department.

Collins's tenure was a difficult period for the Survey. In his 1975 book Reading the Rocks, historian Morris Zaslow blamed this on poor leadership by Collins, alleging specifically micromanagement, political ineptitude, and narrow vision. W. C. Gussow, a subordinate of Collins at the Survey, countered that when Collins took office the Survey had been weakened in the years prior by World War I, a fire in its headquarters, and a mass resignation by 10 senior geologists. Gussow attributed the Survey's later troubles to budget cuts in 1930 under Prime Minister R. B. Bennett prompted by the Great Depression.

While Director, Collins served as President of two important scholarly organisations. In 1929 he was President of Section IV, the Geological and Biological Sciences section, of the Royal Society of Canada. In 1934 he was President of the Geological Society of America.

== Death ==
Collins suffered health problems long before his death, undergoing a major operation as early as 1926. Nonetheless he carried on with field work for some time before succumbing to kidney failure on January 14, 1937.

== Bibliography ==
- Collins, William Henry (1925). North Shore of Lake Huron. Geological Survey of Canada.
- Quirke, Terence T.; Collins, William Henry (1930). The Disappearance of the Huronian. F. A. Acland.
