= Lomagundi-Jatuli Carbon Isotope Excursion =

Carbon isotope excursion

The Lomagundi-Jatuli Carbon Isotope Excursion or Lomagundi-Jatuli Event (LJE) was a carbon isotope excursion in the Paleoproterozoic between 2.3 and 2.1 Ga, having the largest and longest-lasting positive δ^{13}C values found in marine carbonate rocks. The δ^{13}C values range from +5 to + 30‰. Carbon isotope compositions in marine carbonates typically fluctuate around zero per mil (‰) through time. To coincide with the LJE global δ^{13}C_{carb} levels, the amount of buried organic carbon would have needed to double or triple, and over millions of years.

Measuring δ^{13}C values within marine carbonate rocks provides scientists with a window into the history of fluxes in the global carbon cycle over the course of Earth history.

In the context of the global carbon cycle, "flux" refers to the movement or flow of carbon between different reservoirs or components of the Earth system. This includes the atmosphere, oceans, terrestrial biosphere (plants and soil), and geosphere (rocks and sediments). These carbon fluxes are driven by various processes, including photosynthesis (which removes CO_{2} from the atmosphere and incorporates it into plant biomass), respiration and decay (which return CO_{2} to the atmosphere), weathering of rocks (which can transfer carbon from the geosphere to the hydrosphere and atmosphere), and the dissolution and precipitation of carbonate minerals in the ocean

Understanding these fluxes, especially within the LJE, is crucial for studying the global carbon cycle. They determine the concentration of carbon dioxide in the Earth's atmosphere, which in turn influences the planet's climate. While the LJE's high δ^{13}C_{carb} values were first thought to show a substantial local increase in organic carbon (f_{org}) in the localities in which the elevated values were found, marine carbonate outcrops with similarly elevated values have since been found around the world, shifting consideration that this event reflects a global increase.

Changes in carbon fluxes can lead to significant variations in atmospheric CO_{2} levels and thus have been a major focus of research, and debate, especially in the context of anthropogenic climate change.

== Locations and duration ==
Assuming this excursion is globally synchronous in its commencement and termination, the duration has been dated to range from a maximum of 249 ± 9 Myr (2306 ± 9 Ma to 2057 ± 1 Ma) to a minimum of 128 ± 9.4 Myr (2221 ± 5 Ma to 2106 ± 8 Ma).

Region	Formation	Age (Ma)	Method	Max or Min	Reference
Wyoming, USA	Fletcher Park Rhyolite	1780 +- 6	ID-TIMS	Min	
Wyoming, USA	Keystone Quartz Diorite	1781 +- 7	ID-TIMS	Min	
Uruguay	Uruguayan Dyke swarm	1790 +- 5	ID-TIMS	Min	
Pilbara Craton, Australia	June Hill Volcanics	1795 +- 7	SIMS	Min	
Gabon, Africa	Francevillian Basin	2050 +- 30	ID-TIMS	Max	
South Africa, Africa	Rooihoogte Formation	2316+-7	TIMS (Re-Os)	Max	
Russia, Kola Craton	Polisarka Sedimentary Formation	2434 +-1.2	ID-TIMS	Max	

Table 1: Lomagundi-Jatuli Event localities presenting similarly elevated δ13 values, formations of occurrence, dated age of formation, and procedural method of δ^{13}C value analysis.

The extremely positive carbon isotope values having occurred during the LJE can be seen on all continents, with the notable exception of Antarctica, having stratigraphic thickness ranging from several to tens of meters The highly elevated δ^{13}C values were first found in the Lomagundi Group in Zimbabwe and the Jatuli group in Fennoscandia at a time when the LJE was first hypothesized to have been a local event.

Geographic and geological location	Carbonate lithology	δ13Ccarb variation (‰)	Stratigraphic Thickness	References
Africa				
Lomagundi Group, Zimbabwe	Dolostones	4.0 to +13.4	300 m	
Francevillian Series, Gabon	Dolostones	2.6 to +6.3	600–2040 m	
Gumbu Group, South Africa	Limestones	4.6 to +7.0		
Duitschland Formation, Pretoria Group	Dolostones	−2.0 to +10.1	1000m	
Sengoma formation, Botswana	Dolostones and limestones	7.6 to 9.2	167 m	
Silverton formations Pretoria Group, South Africa	Dolostones and limestones	8.3 to +11.2	500 to 700 m	
Lucknow Formation, Elim Group	Dolostones	8.7 to +10.4	200m	
Australia				
Bubble Well Member, Juderina Formation, Nabberu Basin	Dolostones	5.7 to +8.8	160m	
Asia				
Jhamarkotra Formation, Aravalli Supergroup, India	Dolostones	5.4 to +11.1	1500m	
South America				
Cercadinho Formation, Minas Supergroup, Brazil	Dolostones	3.3 to +5.4	317m	
Fecho do Funil Formation, Minas Supergroup, Brazil	Dolostones	5.6 to +7.4	38-50m	
Rio Itapicuru Greenstone Belt, Brazil	Dolostones	5.5 to +9.0	20-30m	
Ipueira-Medrado, Itabuna-Salvador-Curaçá orogen, Brazil	Dolostones	2.2 to +6.9	30-40m	
Paso Severino Fm., Río de la Plata craton, Uruguay	Dolostones	−5.6 to +11.6	2100-2700	
North America				
Gordon Lake Formation, Canada	Dolostones	-1 to +8.2	300-700 meters	
Kona Dolomite, United States	Dolostones	1.9 to +9.5	870 meters	
Nash Fork Formation, United States	Dolostones	0.2 to 28.2	1700m	
Slaughterhouse Formation, United States	Dolostones	5.6 to +16.6	500m	

Table 2: Carbonate lithology within global formations, including associated δ^{13}C_{carb} variation (‰) values, and stratigraphic thicknesses of each.

== Methods ==
Scientists choose which geochronology method is best suited for the types of rocks and sediments they work with. Attempting to date marine carbonate rocks is a challenge due to use of uranium (U) and lead (Pb). These rocks do not have a high composition of uranium, but contain a lot of lead. Both of these can experience diagenetic overprinting, a modification over geologic time. Laser Ablation Inductively Coupled Plasma Mass Spectrometry (LA-ICP-MS) has been able to work around this challenge, but is less successful when applying Isotope Dilution-Thermal Ionization Mass Spectrometry (ID-TIMS) . The spatial resolution makes this a preferred method, although testing continues. Secondary ion mass spectrometry (SIMS) is a common method of dating.

== Genesis of the LJE ==
=== Synchronous, global-scale disturbance ===
The global view concludes that during the Lomagundi carbon isotope excursion carbonates were deposited world-wide with large amounts of ^{13}C enrichment. The hypothesis that the LJE is related to the Great Oxidation Event (GOE), with the LJE causing a large deviation in the global carbon reservoir, which in turn led to disequilibrium of the carbon cycle and released oxygen.

To explain this global ^{13}C enrichment, the oxidation of siderite (FeCO_{3}, with other Fe^{2+} carbonate minerals), was proposed as a hypothesis because it produces four times the amount of CO_{2} than it consumes O_{2}. The oxidation of siderite was the driver for the carbon needed in burial and further oxidation, as well as the accumulation of O_{2}, making the length of the LJE dependent on the size of the Archean siderite reservoir.

Another hypothesis to explain the global nature of the LJE, is large tectonic change leading to increased degassing of volcanic CO_{2}, which could have increased deposition of carbonates and organic matter, due to higher weathering rates and nutrients to the ocean. Similar to a tectonic change, the formation of subaerial continents or global glaciations could have also enhanced volcanic CO_{2} leading to the same outcome of CO_{2} and O_{2} in carbonates and atmosphere. Supporting this, there is evidence for the first large continental plates around 2.2-2.1 Gyr experiencing rifting and a global orogeny. During this time frame there was an increase in seawater ^{87}Sr/ ^{86}Sr, which indicates there was higher levels of continental erosion. To reinforce the effect of high ^{87}Sr/ ^{86}Sr, the first known glaciations occurred during 2.2-2.1 Gyr as well which favours weathering rates by lowering sea level.

=== Localized, Facies driven process ===
This hypothesis acknowledges that there is a global change to the carbon cycle, and agrees that it was a globally synchronous event, but with the idea that different facies environments drive the high C-isotope values. This meaning that the values of δ^{13}C and changes in the values are because of processes in individual basins, depending on where the locality is along a carbonate platform/slope. Using ^{13}C carbonate data from locations worldwide and the stratigraphic descriptions, the values can be organized into open marine, nearshore marine-inner shelf and intertidal-coastal-sabka, with a noticed correlation between facies and ^{13}C carbonate values. For open marine the mean ^{13}C carbonate value was +1.5 ± 2.4‰, +6.2 ± 2.0‰ for inner-shelf, and +8.1 ± 3.8‰ for intertidal settings. Using this hypothesis, the extremely positive δ^{13}C values can be explained by changes in local dissolved inorganic carbon (DIC) pools, influenced in individual basins, not representative of world-wide change in ocean DIC.

=== Localized, Diagenesis or Methanogenesis ===
For a global carbon isotope excursion, sedimentary organic carbon (shales) tend to show a trend as well, as an excursion would affect the δ^{13}C value of the biosphere and therefore sedimentary organic matter. Between 2.60 and 1.60 Ga there is no trend within organic carbon. Fluctuations in δ^{13}Ccan be linked to isotopic alteration from breakdown of organic matter due to diagenesis and metamorphism.

A process in sediment columns that can contribute to carbonates with high levels of ^{13}C, methanogenesis, could have caused carbonates enriched in ^{13}C, creating an explanation for the δ^{13}C values reaching +28‰. To explain the LJE, a deeper methanic zone in oceans during the start of ocean oxygenation (the GOE) would push pore water DIC to higher δ^{13}C values. The carbonates forming at this time would record δ^{13}C enrichment.
