= Siderian =

First period of the Paleoproterozoic Era

- 2500 – 2300 Ma
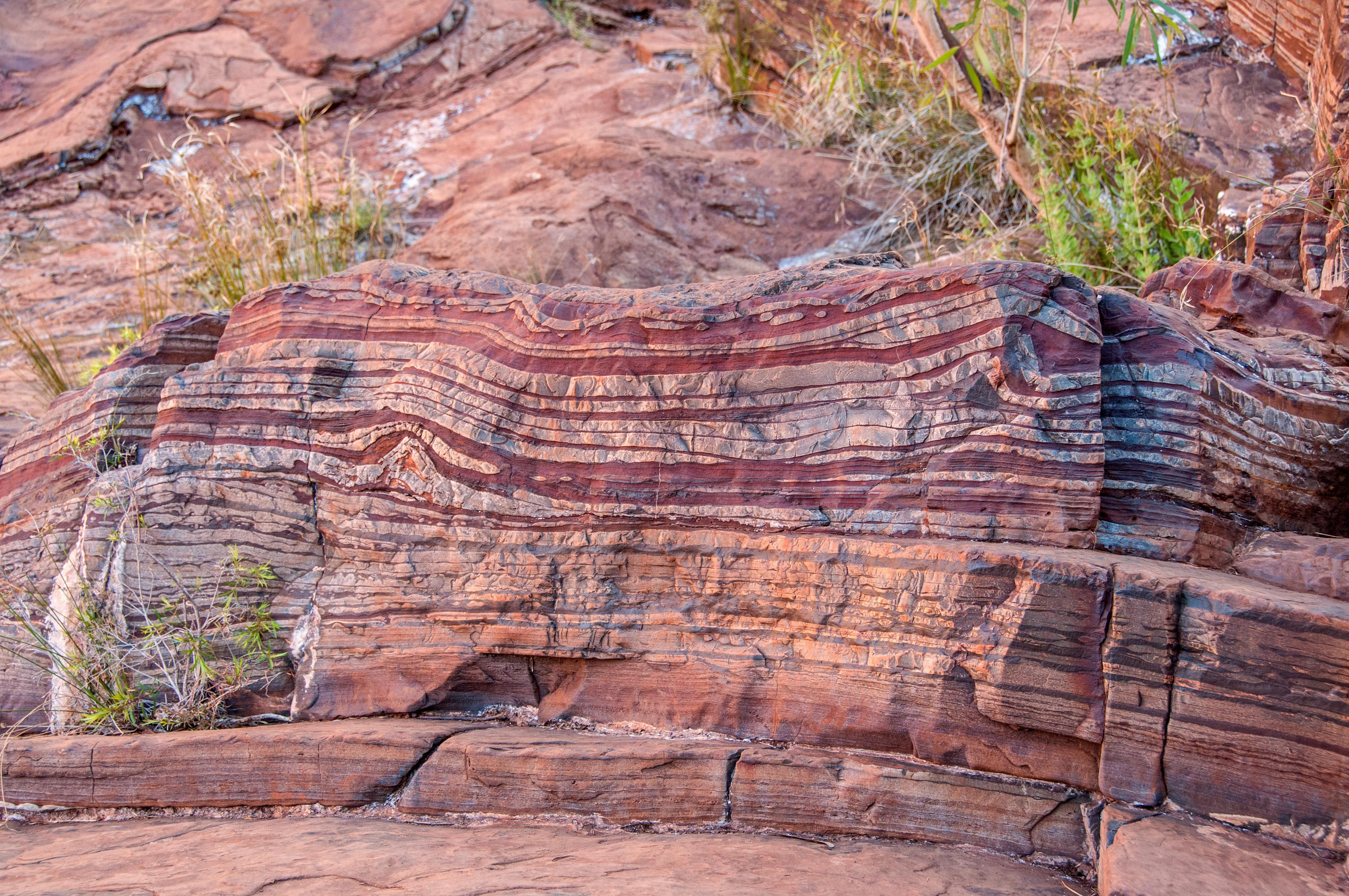
- A Siderian banded iron formation in Dales Gorge, Western Australia

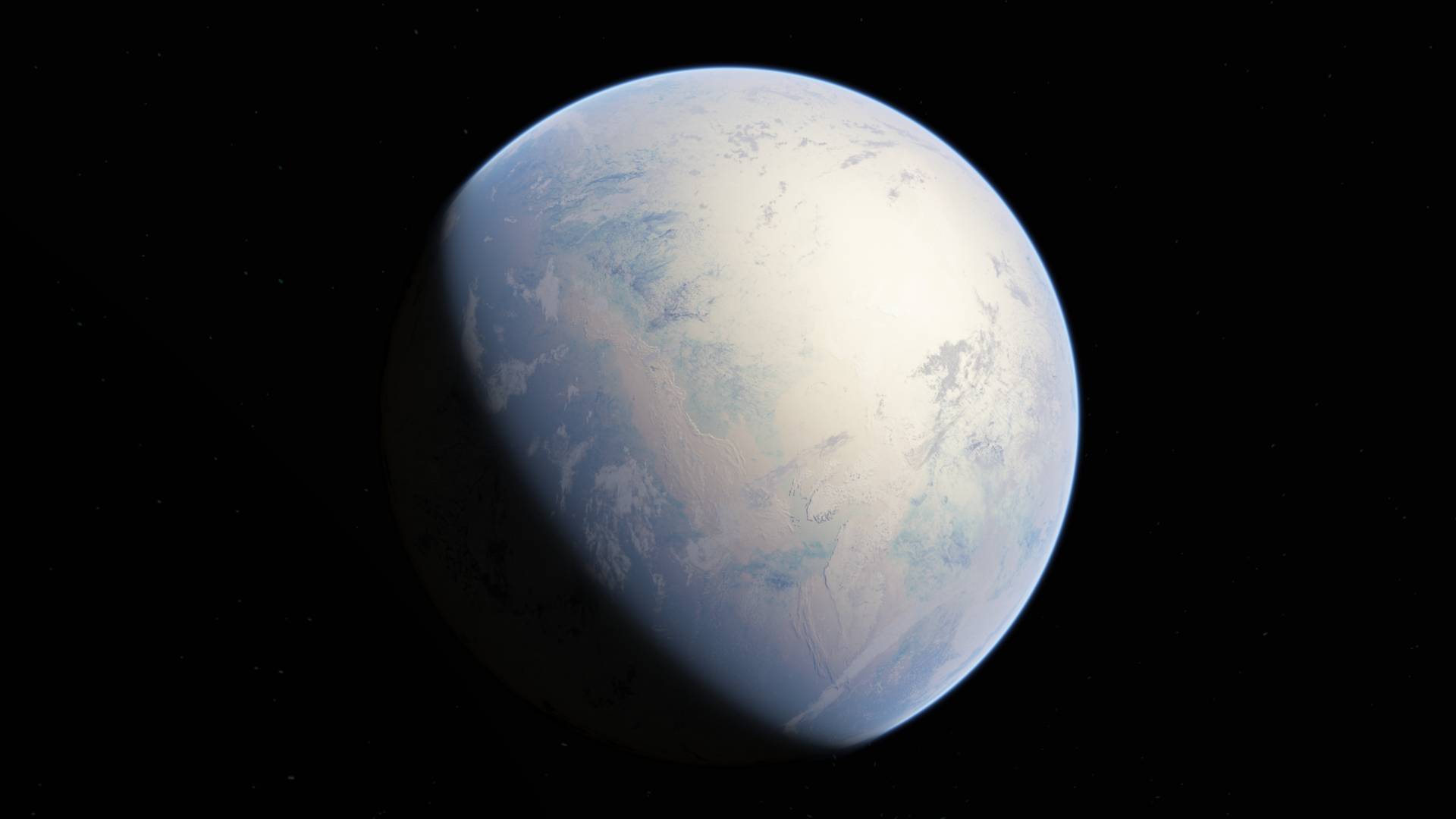
- Artist's impression of the Earth during the Huronian glaciation, starting from the mid-Siderian

Chronology
← / Huronian glaciation; ← / Beginning of the Great Oxidation Event; ← / Breakup of the supercontinent Kenorland
Major glacial period
Events of the Siderian Period; Vertical axis scale: Millions of years ago
- Proposed redefinition(s): 2630 – 2420 Ma Kranendonk et al., 2012; 3000? (Note: A lower boundary was not defined for this proposal.) – c. 2450 Ma Shields et al., 2021
- Proposed container: Neoarchean Kranendonk et al., 2012; Neoarchean Shields al., 2021

Etymology
- Name formality: Formal

Usage information
- Celestial body: Earth
- Regional usage: Global (ICS)
- Time scale(s) used: ICS Time Scale

Definition
- Chronological unit: Period
- Stratigraphic unit: System
- Time span formality: Formal
- Lower boundary definition: Defined chronometrically
- Lower GSSA ratified: 1990
- Upper boundary definition: Defined chronometrically
- Upper GSSA ratified: 1990

Atmospheric and climatic data
- Mean atmospheric O_{2} content: c. 0.014007 vol % (0% of modern)
- Mean atmospheric CO_{2} content: c. 11000 ppm (39 times pre-industrial)

The Siderian ( /saɪˈdɪəri.ən, sɪ-/) is the first geologic period in the Paleoproterozoic Era and Proterozoic Eon. It lasted from 2500 to 2300 million years ago (Ma), spanning 200 million years, and is followed by the Rhyacian Period. Instead of being based on tectonic layers, these dates are defined chronometrically.

Most continental activity in this period revolved around the breakup of the supercontinent Kenorland. While this event mainly occurred in the North American craton, volcanic intrusions and dike swarms appeared in plates pertaining to Northwestern Europe, South Africa, and Australia in connection to Kenorland's rifting. In the ocean, emissions from hydrothermal vents contributed to the production and crystallization of minerals, along with varying concentrations of sulfur and iron. While this sedimentation circulated in the ocean, the amounts deposited on the ocean floor contributed to the development of banded iron formations, along with a diverse range of ores such as pyrite and magnetite.

Cyanobacteria continued to develop their molecular structure, with eukaryotes beginning to appear near the end of the period, and they contributed to the ocean's oxidation. Their presence eventually became the partial cause for the build-up of oxygen in Earth's atmosphere, becoming known as the Great Oxidation Event. This led to a decrease in methane and carbon dioxide, which were two major greenhouse gases at the time, dropping the overall global temperature below 0 °C. As a result of this, the Earth experienced three snowball events which are collectively known as the Huronian glaciation.

== Etymology and history ==
The name Siderian is derived from the Greek word sideros, meaning "iron", and refers to the banded iron formations formed during this period. Before its use, the period was suggested to be named as the Huronian Era (Note: The "Era" subdivision was chosen under the pretense to use a Precambrian chronostratic scale, and does not represent the modern use defined by the International Commission on Stratigraphy.) with a boundary from 2450 to 2200 Ma, in correlation to the sedimentary record of Canada's Huronian Supergroup. Despite the stratigraphic use of the term "Huronian" since the nineteenth century, the Siderian period was proposed under the current nomenclature (2500 to 2300 Ma) in 1989 by the Subcommission on Precambrian Stratigraphy. It was later ratified in 1990 by the International Union of Geological Sciences as a subdivision of the Proterozoic Eon.

While the Siderian is well-defined by the lower edge of iron-deposition layers and the initial appearance of glacial deposits, alternate names have been suggested to mark the period stratigraphically. In 2012, Kranendonk et al. proposed to set the Siderian Period to an earlier date range, due to the slow expansion of the period's continental plates, spanning from 2630 to 2420 Ma as the final subdivision of the Neoarchean Era. They also suggested adjusting the upper half of the Siderian's preceding definition to occur from 2420 to 2250 Ma as the Oxygenian Period, in response to the change in Earth's atmosphere during this time. In 2021, Shields et al. presented a similar alteration, but with the Siderian ending at about 2450 Ma, and the first period of the Paleoproterozoic Era termed the Skourian instead of the Oxygenian. The name "Skourian" would refer to the oxidation of the ocean's iron supply, and its period would span from about 2450 to 2300 Ma. As of June 2026, the Siderian retains its 1989 definition, and is the earliest internationally recognized period on Earth's geologic time scale.

== Paleogeography ==
=== Paleotectonics and lithology ===
Tectonic activity mainly revolved around the growth of continental plates during the early Siderian. Many cratons at the time, including the Gawler, Superior, and Pilbara cratons, experienced volcanic activity through a global plume breakout, which occurred from 2500 to 2450 Ma. During that time, depositions at banded iron formations began occurring at the Kaapvaal and Pilbara cratons. Additionally, volcanic and sedimentary rocks began to deposit into the Transvaal Basin at 2400 Ma, lasting until 2000 Ma in the Orosirian period.

Some depositional activity in what would become present-day Australia involved a selection of supersequences, consisting of a diverse set of densely packed sediments. The Brockman Supersequence, lasting from 2500 to 2449 Ma, has been shown to at least consist of mudrock and sediments from banded iron formations, which were deposited during rising sea levels and times of volcanic activity. Additionally, traces of sulfur isotopes have been found in this sequence's Brockman Iron Formation, indicating a rise in the atmosphere's oxygen at the time. The Woongarra Supersequence followed, consisting of depositions mainly from rhyolite, but with layers of diabase and basalt present beforehand, dating back to 2449 Ma. It was then capped by the Turee Creek Supersequence, which presents itself with a layer of sandstone and limestone sequences, and lasted from 2449 to 2410 Ma before a stratigraphic hiatus occurred.

On the North American plate, sediments began to pack and form the Huronian and Snowy Pass supergroups. Sandstone in the Huronian Supergroup was deposited in diverse compositions between 2450 and 2219 Ma, with some layers taking arkosic, felspathic, and quartzose structures. While major depositions involved conglomerates of siltstone, limestone, and granite, there were trace amounts of gold, uranium, and aluminium present as well. In the Wyoming Craton, the Snowy Pass Supergroup holds signs of quartzite deposited throughout its layers, accompanied by sedimentary structures of marble, phyllite, and pebble conglomerates. Additionally, there are deposits of rhythmite and dropstone in northern Canada's Hurwitz Group from between 2450 and 2110 Ma. The extent of these Laurentian depositions ranges from glacial origins and ice sheets to rivers and shallow marine conditions.

In northwestern Europe, evidence of deposition has been found in the Baltic Shield, within the lower portion of the Karelian Supergroup. Volcanic sediments from mafic complexes have been layered with porphyry containing blue quartz within the Sumian Group, being deposited during the first half of the Sideran. In the following sequence, saprolite and pyroclastics have been found in the Sarolian Group, with traces spanning from 2400 to 2300 Ma. Diamictites have also been identified in this sequence, providing evidence of glacial deposits occurring in the area.

The lower half of the Transvaal Supergroup in South Africa has been deposited for the duration of the Siderian Period. It mainly consists of a patterned sequence of shale, sandstone, and siltstone, and is embedded with an additional diversity of sediments. Traces of hematite, magnetite, and marl can be found in the Eastern Transvaal Basin, while the Griqualand West Basin holds instances of graywacke, iron lutite, and hyaloclastite deposits. Some sequences have been deposited as banded iron formations, such as those presented through the Penge and Doradale formations. However, different types of BIFs are also present in this supergroup, with granular, silicate, and orthochemical (Note: In the context of iron formations, "orthochemical" refers to iron formations that are dominated by fine-grained iron-rich material, consisting of tiny rock grains that were formed in situ (i.e., formed where they were deposited, not transported to their place of deposition).) iron formations existing in the Koegas Subgroup.

In the North China Craton, banded iron formations, schists of various qualities, and additional layers of sedimentation have been deposited during this period, following the Fupingian orogeny which occurred 2550 Ma. The Shuangshanzi Group in eastern Hebei holds layers of amphibolite and mica-granulite. In the Wutai Group found within the Taihang and Wutai Mountains, conglomerates of tholeiitic basalt, rhyodacite, and tonalite have been identified.

=== Magmatism ===
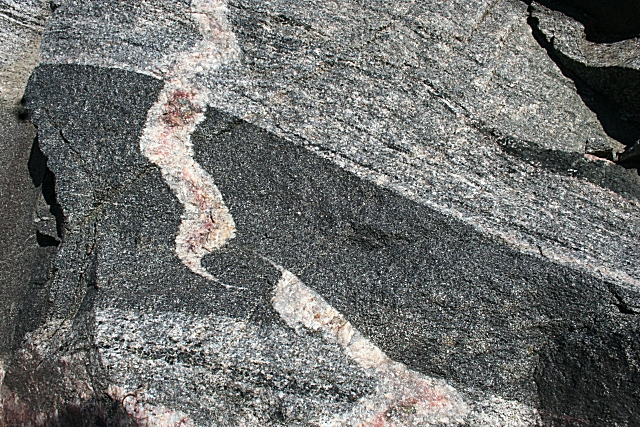
Gray Badcallian gneiss (c. 2500 Ma) intruded by a dark amphibolitic Scourie dike (c. 2400 Ma), both intruded by younger granitic veins

Magma in the form of dike swarms penetrated the surface of multiple cratons during the Siderian, taking place in some of the major continental plates such as those spanning North America, South Africa, and Australia. About 2470 Ma, the Mistassini dike swarm penetrated the Superior Craton. With a surface area of at least 100,000 square kilometers (39,000 sq mi), it can be classified as a large igneous province (LIP). It was followed by the Matachewan dike swarm, an LIP occurring from about 2470 to 2450 Ma, and spanning a surface area of at least 300,000 square kilometers. The Mistassini and Matachewan swarms can be genetically associated with each other, as the Matachewan swarm intruded into the Superior Craton in the area between Lake Superior and James Bay. In the region pertaining to present-day Scotland, the Scourie dike swarm penetrated the Lewisian Gneiss Complex from about 2418 to 2375 Ma, while the Widgiemooltha dike swarm intruded into the Yilgarn Craton in Australia at around 2410 Ma. The Widgiemooltha swarm occurred in close proximity to the Sebanga Poort dike's intrusion into the Zimbabwe Craton, which occurred about 2408 Ma.

=== Breakup of Kenorland ===
Tectonic rifting began separating the supercontinent Kenorland at around 2450 Ma, with the breakup mainly occurring in Laurentia. As a result, the Hurwitz Group in northern Canada experienced continental stretching and depression, resulting in the depositions of the Noomut, Padlei, and Kinga Formations, along with the creation of the Hurwitz Basin. Additionally, low sulfidation deposits holding copper and nickel began to form in the Nena and Kalahari cratons, while zircons formed within the Deep Lake Group in what is now the Sierra Madre Range. Despite the intrusions from dike swarms contributing to the rifting, Kenorland experienced little continental movement, and there are no signs of ocean development as a result. However, sedimentation from shallow waters began to occupy the Strel'na Group in what is now the Kola Peninsula.

== Climate ==
=== Great Oxidation Event ===
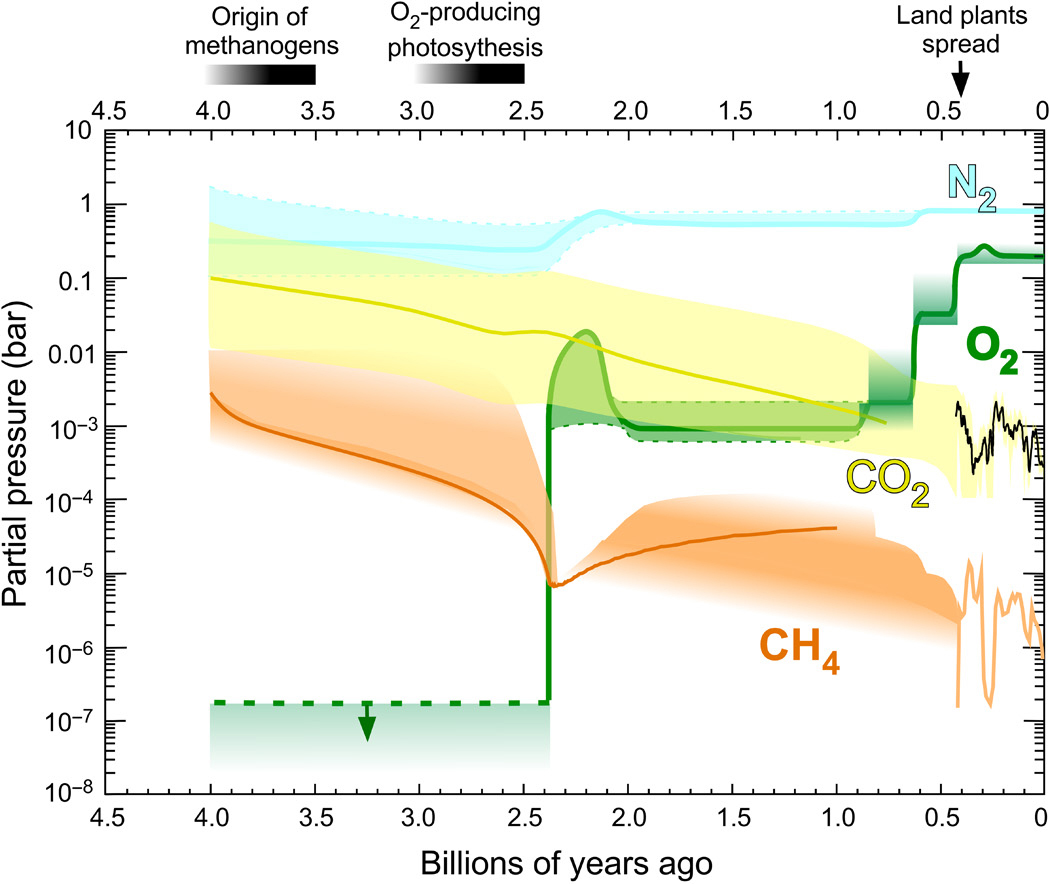
Semi-logarithmic chart of atmospheric levels throughout Earth's history, with the surge of oxygen occurring approximately 2.4 billion years ago

Since the beginning of the Siderian period, there had been an irreversible rise of oxygen in Earth's atmosphere, which has come to be known as the Great Oxidation Event. The partial pressure of oxygen in the air (pO_{2}) has been shown to have increased to at least 10^{4} times its original level, rising from 2 × 10^{−6} bar to at least 2 × 10^{−3} bar between 2410 and 2320 Ma. This rapid change led to a reduction in atmospheric methane, causing a series of ice ages known as the Huronian glaciation.

The levels of carbonates and organic carbon were relatively stagnant. Carbon-13 isotopes (δ^{13}C), found within dolomites and formations in the Mount Bruce, Transvaal, and Huronian supergroups, maintained a steady level of 0‰ in carbonates, while organic carbon created through the activity and burial of cyanobacteria remained stationary at approximately −28‰. Although this may present itself as a sign of inactivity during this period, it suggests that there were multiple sources causing an equal force of sinks and rises in the levels of oxygen. This includes the influx and settlement of carbon dioxide from volcanic activity which stems from tectonic processes, along with the delivery of phosphate to oceans through cycles of chemical weathering.

As a consequence of the excess oxygen, a shift began to occur in the level and activity of greenhouse gases. The carbon dioxide in the atmosphere maintained equilibrium at a partial pressure of 1.1 × 10^{−2} bar, due to the oxidation of methane in the air, silicate weathering on the surface, and emissions from volcanic activity. However, this process depleted the amounts of methane by a significant amount, dropping from 300 to 4 ppmv. Despite the balance in carbon dioxide, the significant change in methane caused Earth to undergo a snowball event, dropping the average global temperatures below 0 °C.

=== Huronian glaciation ===
Due to the loss of global temperature, the Earth entered the Huronian glaciation, which lasted from about 2450 to 2200 Ma. While this event has been divided into four separate glaciations, only the first three occur in the Siderian Period, serving as a reaction to the oxidizing environment. Traces of this glaciation have been found in the diamictites and sequences of six cratons, including the Wyoming, Kaapvaal, and Karelia-Kola cratons.

The oldest glaciation correlates to quartz located in the Campbell Lake and Headquarters formations, along with glacial deposits in the Polisarka Formation. It lasted from about 2440 to 2420 Ma, and is generally referred to after the diamictites found in the Duitschland Formation. The second glaciation, known as the Makganyene glaciation after its eponymous formation, is marked by cap carbonate sequences found above the Bruce and Vagner formations, occurring from about 2380 to 2360 Ma. The youngest of the three glaciations occurs from about 2340 to 2310 Ma near the end of the Siderian, represented in the Gowganda Formation of the Huronian Supergroup, and referred to after the Rietfontein diamictite located in South Africa.

== Life ==
By the beginning of the Great Oxidation Event, cyanobacteria developed intercelluar communication through molecular exchange, and began to differentiate from each other. Strands such as those in the Pseudanabaena genus began chaining themselves in a filamentous structure, and Giardia, one of the earliest eukaryotes, emerged at around 2309 Ma. Additionally, flagellated microorganisms began to develop in the ocean's crust, appearing at about 2400 Ma.

Traces of cyanobacteria have made marks in a few deposition sites. Microfossils embedded in black chert have been dated back to 2450 Ma in Australia's Turee Creek Group, while bacterial remnants from the Conophyton and Siphonophycus genus have been preserved in South Africa's Kuruman Iron Formation. In China, stromatolites have been spotted in the Dashiling and Qingshicun formations of the Hutuo Group, existing for the duration of the Siderian Period. Additionally, findings in the Fennoscandian Shield show that the taxonomy of stromatolites began to diversify at around 2330 Ma.

There are signs of fungus-like organisms appearing at about 2400 Ma within the cracks and vesicles of filamentous structures. Open spaces and cavities below the seafloor led to the development of root-like structures such as hyphae and mycelia, which have been preserved in basalt and clay within the Ongeluk Formation in South Africa. This has raised questions as to the preexistence of a stable environment for fungal development, as evidenced by the fossil's similarities with volcanic pillows from the Devonian Period.

== Marine geochemistry ==
=== Isotopic composition of iron ===
The fluctuation of iron in seawater was met with an increase in the creation and deposition of iron oxides and ferrous minerals. Hydrothermal vents served as the ocean's primary source of iron, increasing its isotopic ^{56}Fe/^{54}Fe ratio (δ^{56}Fe) by up to 3‰, compared to values in the Neoarchean Era. Some of the iron present was oxidized into iron(II) oxide and iron(III) oxide, either through the bacterial process of disimilatory iron reduction, or by the presence of oxygen in its aqueous form. Isotopes with a particularly heavy δ^{56}Fe value, however, deposited in iron reservoirs before 2400 Ma, which would develop into banded iron formations holding traces of ores such as siderite, magnetite, and greenalite.

=== Isotopic composition of sulfur ===
Before the Great Oxidation Event, sulfur was mainly supplied as sulfide through the volcanic outgassing of hydrogen sulfide and sulfur dioxide. These molecules were then deposited into the anoxic seawater at concentrations of 1–2 mM, with sulfide minerals such as pyrite being created as a result, and sulfate being oxidized from the aqueous solution. Due to the lack of oxygen, however, there was a very minimal amount of sulfate in circulation, falling within a concentration of 5–200 μM before 2400 Ma. At the time, most of the sulfate available converted into sulfide through processes of sulfate reduction, such as being recycled back into the mantle, or by conversion via microbial activity.

As oxygen began to rapidly accumulate in the atmosphere, sulfate levels began to increase in the seawater and sedimentary reservoirs, while the circulation of sulfide decreased as a result. Between 2500 and 2300 Ma, the isotopic ratio of sulfate (δ^{34}S) increased from 10 to 12‰ as a result of aerobic weathering and precipitation, entering the sedimentary record as gypsum and anhydrite. At the same time, the levels of sulfide experienced decreases as a result of the spike in oxygen, with its δ^{34}S value reaching as low as −30‰.

=== Isotopic composition of nitrogen ===
The isotopic ratio of nitrogen (δ^{15}N) was relatively constant during the Siderian, ranging from 1.1 to 7.7‰ between 2450 and 2300 Ma. Some concentrations formed as kerogen in South Africa's Timeball Hill Formation, while traces existed as shale in Australia's Turee Creek Group. Despite the stability of nitrogen carried out through its circulation, the oxidation of the ocean's surface water slowly increased the size of nitrate reservoirs, with seawater concentrations ranging from 0.35 to 3.5 μM.

=== Composition of strontium and rubidium ===
There were fluctuations in the ocean's level of strontium. At the time, its ^{87}Sr/^{86}Sr isotopic ratio was relatively balanced; while its sources involved periods of high weathering rates, its sinks were due to the input of strontium from hydrothermal ventilation, along with the recrystallization of calcite and dolomite in the ocean's crust. Nonetheless, the ratio's value began a trend of increase up until the Orosirian Period, beginning with a value of 0.7022 in 2500 Ma. Traces of this strontium have been identified within the Polisarka Formation's bedding. The concentrations in carbonate rocks ranged between 560 and 1030 ppm, dating between 2441 and 2434.8 Ma, while calcites and inorganic aragonites hold values of 1000 and 9000 ppm respectively.

Strontium has also been detected through the beta decay and radiometric dating of rubidium (Rb–Sr), and is mainly connected to the deposition of volcanic rocks. At the Fennoscandian Shield, this isotopic presence has been found in dacite and basaltic andesite within the Pechenga–Varzuga Belt, dating back to 2324 Ma, and indicates the creation of paleosols from an intense weathering period. Similar Rb–Sr datings have been found in the Superior and Kaapvaal cratons; the 2330 Ma dating of volcanic tuffs in North America's McKam Formation serves as one of the marks of the beginning of the Huronian glaciation, while a 2300 Ma dating in South Africa represents a unconformity between the Transvaal and Ventersdrop supergroups. Additionally, rubidium and strontium have been detected in migmatite found in eastern Hebei's Qianxi Group, and are dated back to 2480 Ma.

== See also ==
- Sleaford orogeny – a craton forming event which occurred from 2460 to 2410 million years ago
