= Huronian Supergroup =

Assemblage of geologic formations in Canada

The Huronian Supergroup is a Proterozoic assemblage of geologic groups within the Superior Craton of the Canadian Shield in Ontario and Quebec. It extends from west of Sault Ste. Marie east to the Ontario-Quebec border and is part of the larger Southern Geologic Province. The Huronian Supergroup is interpreted to have been deposited within a rift basin that evolved into a largely marine passive margin setting.

== Stratigraphy ==
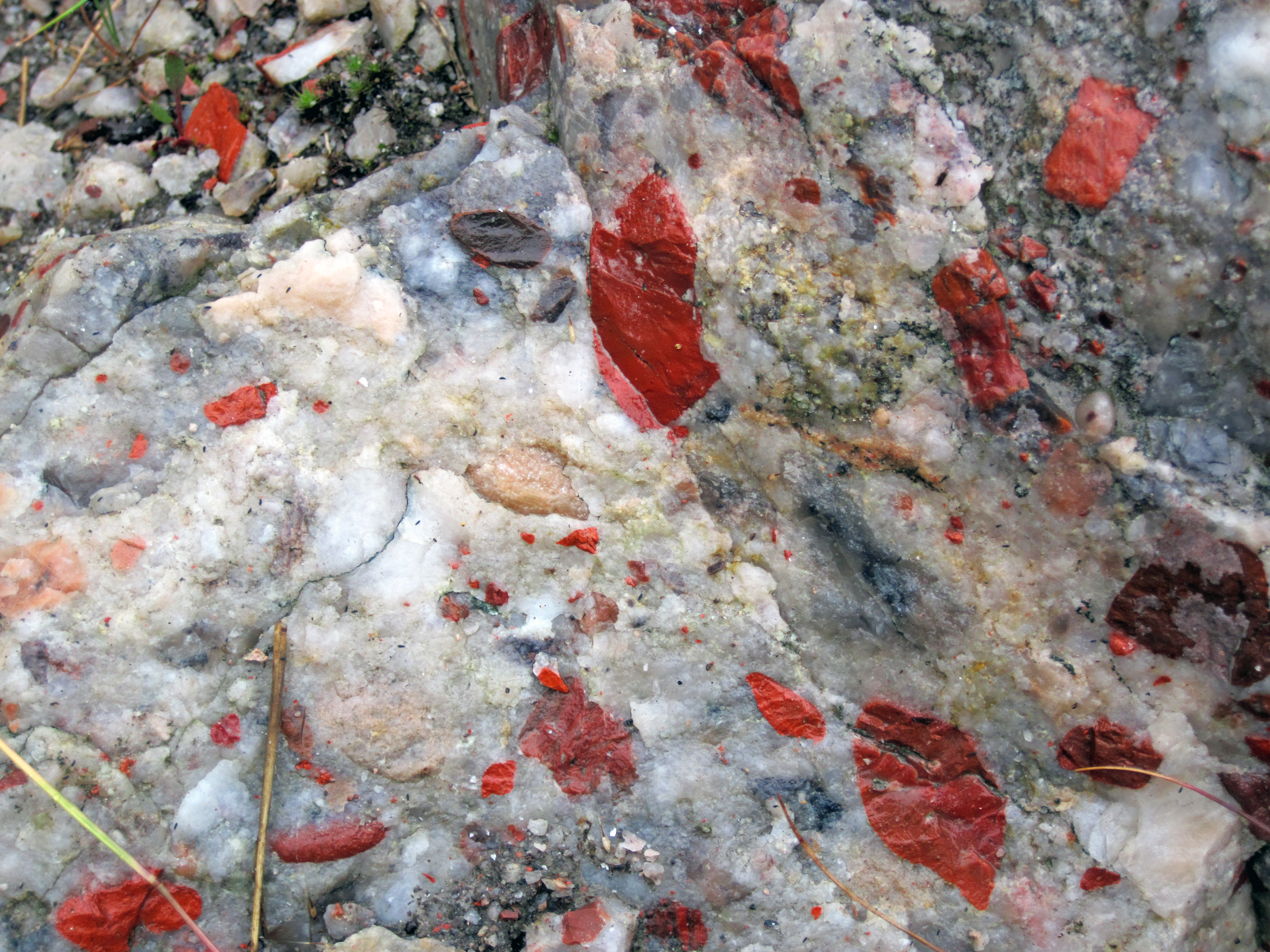
The characteristic red jasper after which the jasper conglomerate is named.

The Huronian Supergroup consists of four groups. All of the rocks are low grade metamorphic sedimentary rocks or igneous rocks.

The four geologic groups that make up the Huronian supergroup are the Elliot Lake Group, Hough Lake Group, Quirke Lake Group, and the Cobalt Group (from oldest to youngest). Major glacial periods, collectively referred to as the Huronian glaciation, are inferred from diamictite sequences deposited in the Hough Lake, Quirke Lake, and Cobalt groups. The sequence contains the distinctive jasper conglomerate (or "puddingstone", among other names), with its striking red jasper clasts.

== Age ==
The bulk of the Huronian Group consists of mostly metamorphosed sandstones and mudstones, spanning the Siderian and early Rhyacian periods of the Paleoproterozoic. Since there are no index fossils this old, the sedimentary rocks cannot be dated using fossils as they can in Phanerozoic sedimentary rocks. However, the base of the sequence contains volcanic rocks that have been dated at about 2.480 billion years old (Gya). The top of the Huronian and cross cutting all of the units within it are the Nipissing sills which date to 2.2185 Gya. This brackets the possible ages of the Huronian sediments to between 2.480 Gya and 2.219 Gya.

== See also ==
- Jasper conglomerate
- Huronian glaciation
