= Great Oxidation Event =

Paleoproterozoic surge in atmospheric oxygen

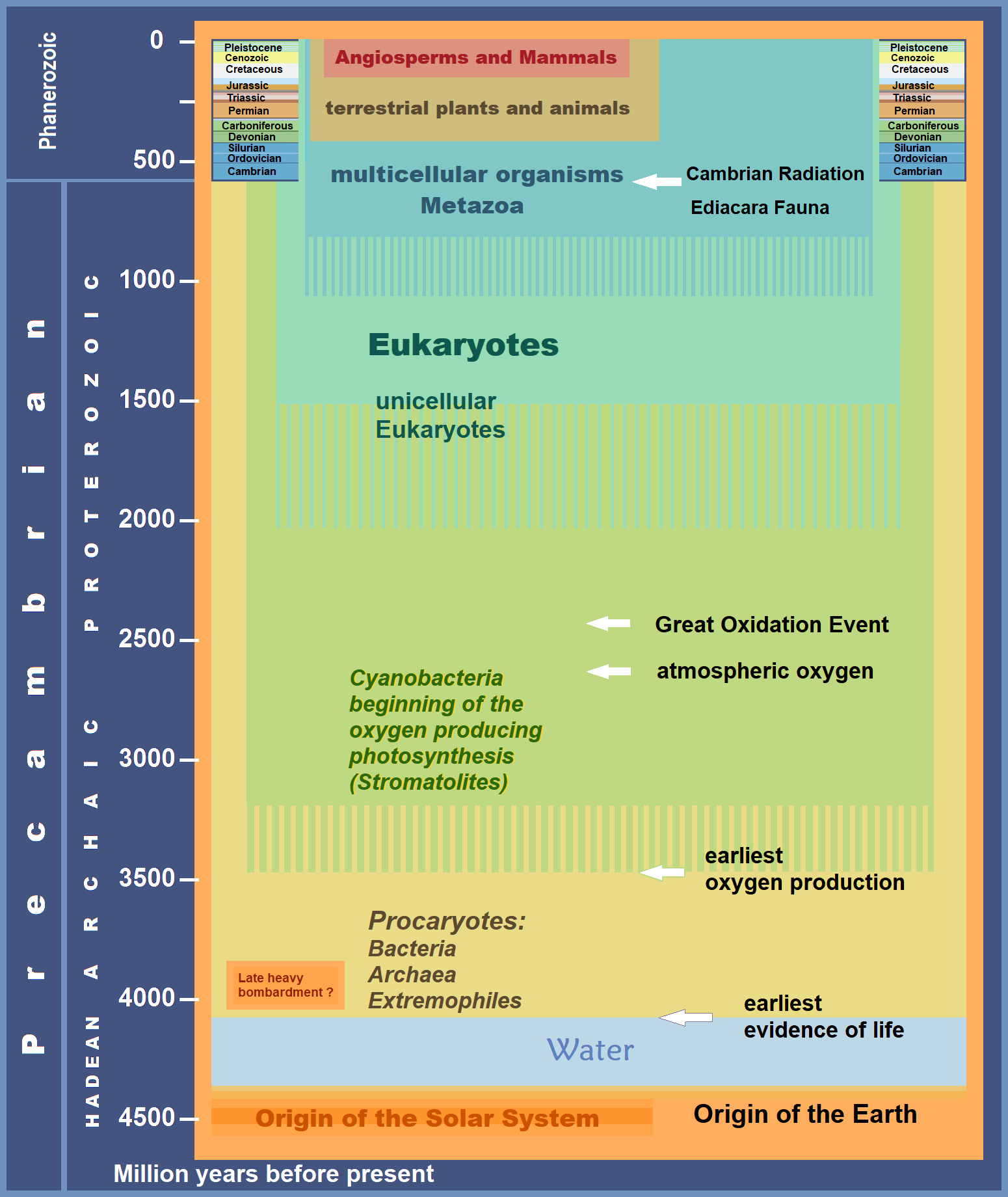
Timescale

O_{2} build-up in the Earth's atmosphere. Red and green lines represent the range of the estimates while time is measured in billions of years ago (Ga).: Stage 1 (3.85–2.45 Ga): Practically no O_{2} in the atmosphere. The oceans were also largely anoxic—with the possible exception of O_{2} in the shallow oceans.; Stage 2 (2.45–1.85 Ga): O_{2} produced, rising to values of 0.02 and 0.04 atm, but absorbed in oceans and seabed rock. (Great Oxidation Event); Stage 3 (1.85–0.85 Ga): O_{2} starts to gas out of the oceans, but is absorbed by land surfaces. No significant change in oxygen level.; Stages 4 and 5 (0.85 Ga – present): Other O_{2} reservoirs filled; gas accumulates in atmosphere. Stage 4 is known as the neoproterozoic oxygenation event.

The Great Oxidation Event (GOE) or Great Oxygenation Event, also called the Oxygen Catastrophe, Oxygen Revolution, Oxygen Crisis, or Oxygen Holocaust, was a time interval during the Earth's Paleoproterozoic era when the Earth's atmosphere and shallow seas first experienced a rise in the concentration of free oxygen. This began approximately 2.46–2.426 billion years ago (Ga) during the Siderian period and ended around 2.06 billion years ago during the Rhyacian. Geological, isotopic, and chemical evidence suggests that biologically produced molecular oxygen (dioxygen or O_{2}) started to accumulate in the Archean prebiotic atmosphere by microbial photosynthesis. It changed the atmosphere from a weakly reducing state practically devoid of oxygen into an oxidizing one containing persistent free oxygen. Atmospheric oxygen concentrations after the GOE are estimated to have been at levels below 1% to as high as ∼10% of the present atmospheric level (PAL) throughout most of the subsequent Proterozoic.

== Overview ==
The appearance of highly reactive free oxygen, which can oxidize organic compounds (especially genetic materials) and thus is toxic to the then-mostly anaerobic biosphere, may have caused the extinction/extirpation of many early organisms on Earth—mostly archaeal colonies that used retinal to use green-spectrum light energy and power a form of anoxygenic photosynthesis (see Purple Earth hypothesis). Although the event is inferred to have constituted a mass extinction, due in part to the great difficulty in surveying microscopic organisms' abundances, and in part to the extreme age of fossil remains from that time, the Great Oxidation Event is typically not counted among conventional lists of "great extinctions", which are implicitly limited to the Phanerozoic eon. In any case, isotope geochemistry data from sulfate minerals have been interpreted to indicate a decrease in the size of the biosphere of >80% associated with changes in nutrient supplies at the end of the GOE.

The GOE is inferred to have been caused by cyanobacteria, which evolved chlorophyll-based photosynthesis that releases dioxygen as a byproduct of water photolysis. The continually produced oxygen eventually depleted all the surface reducing capacity from ferrous iron, sulfur, hydrogen sulfide and atmospheric methane over nearly a billion years. The oxidative environmental change, compounded by a global glaciation, devastated the microbial mats around the Earth's surface. The subsequent adaptation of surviving archaea via symbiogenesis with aerobic proteobacteria (which went endosymbiont and became mitochondria) may have led to the rise of eukaryotic organisms and the subsequent evolution of multicellular life-forms.

== Early atmosphere ==
The composition of the Earth's earliest atmosphere is not known with certainty. However, the bulk was likely nitrogen N_{2}, and carbon dioxide CO_{2}, which are also the predominant nitrogen- and carbon-bearing gases produced by modern volcanism. These are relatively inert gases. Oxygen in its O_{2} form, meanwhile, was present in the atmosphere at just 0.001% of recent atmospheric levels. The Sun shone at about 70% of its modern brightness 4 billion years ago, but there is strong evidence that liquid water existed on Earth at the time. A warm Earth, in spite of a faint Sun, is known as the faint young Sun paradox. Either CO_{2} levels were much higher at the time, providing enough of a greenhouse effect to warm the Earth, or other greenhouse gases were present. The most likely such gas is methane, CH_{4}, which is a powerful greenhouse gas and was produced by early forms of life known as methanogens. Scientists continue to research how the Earth was warmed before life arose.

An atmosphere of N_{2} and CO_{2} with trace amounts of H_{2}O, CH_{4}, carbon monoxide (CO), and hydrogen (H_{2}) is described as a weakly reducing atmosphere. Such an atmosphere contains practically no oxygen. The modern atmosphere contains abundant oxygen (nearly 21%), making it an oxidizing atmosphere. The rise in oxygen is attributed to photosynthesis by cyanobacteria, which are thought to have evolved as early as 3.5 billion years ago.

The scientific understanding of when and how the Earth's atmosphere changed from a weakly reducing to a strongly oxidizing atmosphere largely began with the work of the American geologist Preston Cloud in the 1970s. Cloud observed that detrital sediments older than about 2 billion years contained grains of pyrite, uraninite, and siderite, all minerals containing reduced forms of iron or uranium that are not found in younger sediments because they are rapidly oxidized in an oxidizing atmosphere. He further observed that continental red beds, which get their color from the oxidized (ferric) mineral hematite, began to appear in the geological record at about this time. Banded iron formation largely disappears from the geological record at 1.85 Ga, after peaking at about 2.5 Ga. Banded iron formation can form only when abundant dissolved ferrous iron is transported into depositional basins, and an oxygenated ocean blocks such transport by oxidizing the iron to form insoluble ferric iron compounds. The end of the deposition of banded iron formation at 1.85 Ga is therefore interpreted as marking the oxygenation of the deep ocean. Heinrich Holland further elaborated these ideas through the 1980s, placing the main time interval of oxygenation between 2.2 and 1.9 Ga.

Constraining the onset of atmospheric oxygenation has proven particularly challenging for geologists and geochemists. While there is a widespread consensus that initial oxygenation of the atmosphere happened sometime during the first half of the Paleoproterozoic, there is disagreement on the exact timing of this event. Scientific publications between 2016–2022 have differed in the inferred timing of the onset of atmospheric oxygenation by approximately 500 million years; estimates of 2.7 Ga, 2.501–2.434 Ga 2.501–2.225 Ga, 2.460–2.426 Ga, 2.430 Ga, 2.33 Ga, and 2.3 Ga have been given. Factors limiting calculations include an incomplete sedimentary record for the Paleoproterozoic (e.g., because of subduction and metamorphism), uncertainties in depositional ages for many ancient sedimentary units, and uncertainties related to the interpretation of different geological/geochemical proxies. While the effects of an incomplete geological record have been discussed and quantified in the field of paleontology for several decades, particularly with respect to the evolution and extinction of organisms (the Signor–Lipps effect), this is rarely quantified when considering geochemical records and may therefore lead to uncertainties for scientists studying the timing of atmospheric oxygenation.

== Geological evidence ==
Evidence for the Great Oxidation Event is provided by a variety of petrological and geochemical markers that define this geological event.

=== Continental indicators ===
Paleosols, detrital grains, and red beds are evidence of low oxygen levels. Paleosols (fossil soils) older than 2.4 billion years old have low iron concentrations that suggest anoxic weathering. Detrital grains composed of pyrite, siderite, and uraninite (redox-sensitive detrital minerals) are found in sediments older than ca. 2.4 Ga. These minerals are only stable under low oxygen conditions, and so their occurrence as detrital minerals in fluvial and deltaic sediments are widely interpreted as evidence of an anoxic atmosphere. In contrast to redox-sensitive detrital minerals are red beds, red-colored sandstones that are coated with hematite. The occurrence of red beds indicates that there was sufficient oxygen to oxidize iron to its ferric state, and these represent a marked contrast to sandstones deposited under anoxic conditions which are often beige, white, grey, or green.

=== Banded iron formation ===
Banded iron formations are composed of thin alternating layers of chert (a fine-grained form of silica) and iron oxides (magnetite and hematite). Extensive deposits of this rock type are found around the world, almost all of which are more than 1.85 billion years old and most of which were deposited around 2.5 Ga. The iron in banded iron formations is partially oxidized, with roughly equal amounts of ferrous and ferric iron. Deposition of a banded iron formation requires both an anoxic deep ocean capable of transporting iron in soluble ferrous form, and an oxidized shallow ocean where the ferrous iron is oxidized to insoluble ferric iron and precipitates onto the ocean floor. The deposition of banded iron formations before 1.8 Ga suggests the ocean was in a persistent ferruginous state, but deposition was episodic and there may have been significant intervals of euxinia. The transition from deposition of banded iron formations to manganese oxides in some strata has been considered a key tipping point in the timing of the GOE because it is believed to indicate the escape of significant molecular oxygen into the atmosphere in the absence of ferrous iron as a reducing agent.

=== Iron speciation ===
Black laminated shales, rich in organic matter, are often regarded as a marker for anoxic conditions. However, the deposition of abundant organic matter is not a sure indication of anoxia, and burrowing organisms that destroy lamination had not yet evolved during the time frame of the Great Oxygenation Event. Thus laminated black shale by itself is a poor indicator of oxygen levels. Scientists must look instead for geochemical evidence of anoxic conditions. These include ferruginous anoxia, in which dissolved ferrous iron is abundant, and euxinia, in which hydrogen sulfide is present in the water.

Examples of such indicators of anoxic conditions include the degree of pyritization (DOP), which is the ratio of iron present as pyrite to the total reactive iron. Reactive iron, in turn, is defined as iron found in oxides and oxyhydroxides, carbonates, and reduced sulfur minerals such as pyrites, in contrast with iron tightly bound in silicate minerals. A DOP near zero indicates oxidizing conditions, while a DOP near 1 indicates euxinic conditions. Values of 0.3 to 0.5 are transitional, suggesting anoxic bottom mud under an oxygenated ocean. Studies of the Black Sea, which is considered a modern model for ancient anoxic ocean basins, indicate that high DOP, a high ratio of reactive iron to total iron, and a high ratio of total iron to aluminum are all indicators of transport of iron into a euxinic environment. Ferruginous anoxic conditions can be distinguished from euxinic conditions by a DOP less than about 0.7.

The available evidence suggests that the deep ocean remained anoxic and ferruginous as late as 580 Ma, well after the Great Oxygenation Event, remaining just short of euxinic during much of this interval of time. Deposition of banded iron formation ceased when conditions of local euxinia on continental platforms and shelves began precipitating iron out of upwelling ferruginous water as pyrite.

=== Isotopes ===
Some of the most persuasive evidence for the Great Oxidation Event is provided by the mass-independent fractionation (MIF) of sulfur. The chemical signature of the MIF of sulfur is found prior to 2.4–2.3 Ga but disappears thereafter. The presence of this signature all but eliminates the possibility of an oxygenated atmosphere.

Different isotopes of a chemical element have slightly different atomic masses. Most of the differences in geochemistry between isotopes of the same element scale with this mass difference. These include small differences in molecular velocities and diffusion rates, which are described as mass-dependent fractionation processes. By contrast, MIF describes processes that are not proportional to the difference in mass between isotopes. The only such process likely to be significant in the geochemistry of sulfur is photodissociation. This is the process in which a molecule containing sulfur is broken up by solar ultraviolet (UV) radiation. The presence of a clear MIF signature for sulfur prior to 2.4 Ga shows that UV radiation was penetrating deep into the Earth's atmosphere. This in turn rules out an atmosphere containing more than traces of oxygen, which would have produced an ozone layer that would have shielded the lower atmosphere from UV radiation. The disappearance of the MIF signature for sulfur indicates the formation of such an ozone shield as oxygen began to accumulate in the atmosphere. MIF of sulphur also indicates the presence of oxygen in that oxygen is required to facilitate repeated redox cycling of sulphur. In addition to sulfur MIF, oxygen MIF signatures have also been argued as evidence for the oxygenation of Earth's atmosphere. As oxygen accumulates an ozone layer is established, and photochemical reactions involved in the destruction and reformation of ozone impart a mass independent isotope signature into atmospheric oxygen. Such signatures are preserved within sulfate minerals and existing records corroborate sulfur MIF inferences of oxygenation of the atmosphere in the early Paleoproterozoic.

MIF provides clues to the Great Oxygenation Event. For example, oxidation of manganese in surface rocks by atmospheric oxygen leads to further reactions that oxidize chromium. The heavier ^{53}Cr is oxidized preferentially over the lighter ^{52}Cr, and the soluble oxidized chromium carried into the ocean shows this enhancement of the heavier isotope. The chromium isotope ratio in banded iron formation suggests small but significant quantities of oxygen in the atmosphere before the Great Oxidation Event, and a brief return to low oxygen abundance 500 Ma after the GOE. However, the chromium data may conflict with the sulfur isotope data, which calls the reliability of the chromium data into question. It is also possible that oxygen was present earlier only in localized "oxygen oases". Since chromium is not easily dissolved, its release from rocks requires the presence of a powerful acid such as sulfuric acid (H_{2}SO_{4}) which may have formed through bacterial oxidation of pyrite. This could provide some of the earliest evidence of oxygen-breathing life on land surfaces.

Other elements whose MIF may provide clues to the GOE include carbon, nitrogen, transitional metals such as molybdenum and iron, and non-metal elements such as selenium.

=== Fossils and biomarkers ===
While the GOE is generally thought to be a result of oxygenic photosynthesis by ancestral cyanobacteria, the presence of cyanobacteria in the Archaean before the GOE is a highly controversial topic. Structures that are claimed to be fossils of cyanobacteria exist in rock formed 3.5 Ga. These include microfossils of supposedly cyanobacterial cells and macrofossils called stromatolites, which are interpreted as colonies of microbes, including cyanobacteria, with characteristic layered structures. Modern stromatolites, which can only be seen in harsh environments such as Shark Bay in Western Australia, are associated with cyanobacteria, and thus fossil stromatolites had long been interpreted as the evidence for cyanobacteria. However, it has increasingly been inferred that at least some of these Archaean fossils were generated abiotically or produced by non-cyanobacterial phototrophic bacteria.

Additionally, Archaean sedimentary rocks were once found to contain biomarkers, also known as chemical fossils, interpreted as fossilized membrane lipids from cyanobacteria and eukaryotes. For example, traces of 2α-methylhopanes and steranes that are thought to be derived from cyanobacteria and eukaryotes, respectively, were found in the Pilbara of Western Australia. Steranes are diagenetic products of sterols, which are biosynthesized using molecular oxygen. Thus, steranes can additionally serve as an indicator of oxygen in the atmosphere. However, these biomarker samples have since been shown to have been contaminated, and so the results are no longer accepted.

Carbonaceous microfossils from the Turee Creek Group of Western Australia, which date back to ~2.45–2.21 Ga, have been interpreted as iron-oxidising bacteria. Their presence suggests a minimum threshold of seawater oxygen content had been reached by this interval of time.

=== Other indicators ===
Some elements in marine sediments are sensitive to different levels of oxygen in the environment such as the transition metals molybdenum and rhenium. Non-metal elements such as selenium and iodine are also indicators of oxygen levels.

== Hypotheses ==
Life timeline
← / Earth formed; ← / Earliest water; ← / LUCA; ← / Earliest fossils; ← / Great Oxygenation Event; ← / Sexual reproduction; ← / Earliest fungi; ← / Neoproterozoic oxygenation event; ← / Ediacaran biota; ← / Cambrian explosion; ← / Earliest tetrapods; ← / Earliest hominoid
(million years ago)

The ability to generate oxygen via photosynthesis likely first appeared in the ancestors of cyanobacteria. These organisms evolved at least 2.45–2.32 Ga and probably as early as 2.7 Ga or earlier. However, oxygen remained scarce in the atmosphere until around 2.5 Ga, and banded iron formation continued to be deposited until around 1.85 Ga. Given the rapid multiplication rate of cyanobacteria under ideal conditions, an explanation is needed for the delay of at least 400 million years between the evolution of oxygen-producing photosynthesis and the appearance of significant oxygen in the atmosphere.

Hypotheses to explain this gap must take into consideration the balance between oxygen sources and oxygen sinks. Oxygenic photosynthesis produces organic carbon that must be segregated from oxygen to allow oxygen accumulation in the surface environment, otherwise the oxygen back-reacts with the organic carbon and does not accumulate. The burial of organic carbon, sulfide, and minerals containing ferrous iron (Fe^{2+}) is a primary factor in oxygen accumulation. When organic carbon is buried without being oxidized, the oxygen is left in the atmosphere. In total, the burial of organic carbon and pyrite creates 15.8±3.3 Tmol (1 Tmol = 10^{12} moles) of O_{2} per year. This creates a net O_{2} flux from the global oxygen sources.

The rate of change of oxygen can be calculated from the difference between global sources and sinks. The oxygen sinks include reduced gases and minerals from volcanoes, metamorphism and weathering. The GOE started after these oxygen-sink fluxes and reduced-gas fluxes were exceeded by the flux of O_{2} associated with the burial of reductants, such as organic carbon. About 12.0±3.3 Tmol of O_{2} per year goes to the sinks composed of reduced minerals and gases from volcanoes, metamorphism, percolating seawater and heat vents from the seafloor. On the other hand, 5.7±1.2 Tmol of O_{2} per year oxidizes reduced gases in the atmosphere through photochemical reaction. On the early Earth, there was visibly very little oxidative weathering of continents (e.g., a lack of red beds), and so the weathering sink on oxygen would have been negligible compared to that from reduced gases and dissolved iron in oceans.

Dissolved iron in oceans exemplifies O_{2} sinks. Free oxygen produced during this time was chemically captured by dissolved iron, converting iron Fe and Fe^{2+} to magnetite (Fe^{2+}Fe^{3+}_{2}O_{4}) that is insoluble in water, and sank to the bottom of the shallow seas to create banded iron formations. It took 50 million years or longer to deplete the oxygen sinks. The rate of photosynthesis and associated rate of organic burial also affect the rate of oxygen accumulation. When land plants spread over the continents in the Devonian, more organic carbon was buried and likely allowed higher O_{2} levels to occur. The average time that an O_{2} molecule spends in the air before it is consumed by geological sinks is about 2 million years. That residence time is relatively short in geologic time; so in the Phanerozoic, there must have been feedback processes that kept the atmospheric O_{2} level within bounds suitable for animal life.

=== Evolution by stages ===
Preston Cloud originally proposed that the first cyanobacteria had evolved the capacity to carry out oxygen-producing photosynthesis but had not yet evolved enzymes (such as superoxide dismutase) for living in an oxygenated environment. These cyanobacteria would have been protected from their own poisonous oxygen waste through its rapid removal via the high levels of reduced ferrous iron, Fe(II), in the early ocean. He suggested that the oxygen released by photosynthesis oxidized the Fe(II) to ferric iron, Fe(III), which precipitated out of the sea water to form banded iron formation. He interpreted the great peak in deposition of banded iron formation at the end of the Archean as the signature for the evolution of mechanisms for living with oxygen. This ended self-poisoning and produced a population explosion in the cyanobacteria that rapidly oxygenated the ocean and ended banded iron formation deposition. However, improved dating of Precambrian strata showed that the late Archean peak of deposition was spread out over tens of millions of years, rather than taking place in a very short interval of time following the evolution of oxygen-coping mechanisms. This made Cloud's hypothesis untenable.

Most modern interpretations describe the GOE as a long, protracted process that took place over hundreds of millions of years rather than a single abrupt event, with the quantity of atmospheric oxygen fluctuating in relation to the capacity of oxygen sinks and the productivity of oxygenic photosynthesisers over the course of the GOE. More recently, families of bacteria have been discovered that closely resemble cyanobacteria but show no indication of ever having possessed photosynthetic capability. These may be descended from the earliest ancestors of cyanobacteria, which only later acquired photosynthetic ability by lateral gene transfer. Based on molecular clock data, the evolution of oxygen-producing photosynthesis may have occurred much later than previously thought, at around 2.5 Ga. This reduces the gap between the evolution of oxygen photosynthesis and the appearance of significant atmospheric oxygen.

=== Nutrient famines ===
Another possibility is that early cyanobacteria were starved for vital nutrients, and this checked their growth. However, a lack of the scarcest nutrients, iron, nitrogen, and phosphorus, could have slowed but not prevented a cyanobacteria population explosion and rapid oxygenation. The explanation for the delay in the oxygenation of the atmosphere following the evolution of oxygen-producing photosynthesis likely lies in the presence of various oxygen sinks on the young Earth.

==== Nickel famine ====
Early chemosynthetic organisms likely produced methane, an important trap for molecular oxygen, since methane readily oxidizes to carbon dioxide (CO_{2}) and water in the presence of UV radiation. Modern methanogens require nickel as an enzyme cofactor. As the Earth's crust cooled and the supply of volcanic nickel dwindled, oxygen-producing algae began to outperform methane producers, and the oxygen percentage of the atmosphere steadily increased. From 2.7 to 2.4 Ga the rate of deposition of nickel declined steadily from a level 400 times that of today. This nickel famine was somewhat buffered by an uptick in sulfide weathering at the start of the GOE that brought some nickel to the oceans, without which methanogenic organisms would have declined in abundance more precipitously, plunging Earth into even more severe and long-lasting icehouse conditions than those seen during the Huronian glaciation.

=== Large igneous provinces ===
Another hypothesis posits that a number of large igneous provinces (LIPs) were emplaced during the GOE and fertilised the oceans with limiting nutrients, facilitating and sustaining cyanobacterial blooms.

=== Increasing flux ===
One hypothesis argues that the GOE was the immediate result of photosynthesis, although the majority of scientists suggest that a long-term increase of oxygen is more likely. Several model results show possibilities of long-term increase of carbon burial, but the conclusions are indeterminate.

=== Decreasing sink ===
In contrast to the increasing flux hypothesis, there are several hypotheses that attempt to use decrease of sinks to explain the GOE. One theory suggests increasing lacustrine organic carbon burial as a cause; with more reduced carbon being buried, there was less of it for free oxygen to react with in the atmosphere and oceans, enabling its buildup. A different theory suggests that the composition of the volatiles from volcanic gases was more oxidized. Another theory suggests that the decrease of metamorphic gases and serpentinization is the main key of GOE. Hydrogen and methane released from metamorphic processes are also lost from Earth's atmosphere over time and leave the crust oxidized. Scientists realized that hydrogen would escape into space through a process called methane photolysis, in which methane decomposes under the action of ultraviolet light in the upper atmosphere and releases its hydrogen. The escape of hydrogen from the Earth into space must have oxidized the Earth because the process of hydrogen loss is chemical oxidation. This process of hydrogen escape required the generation of methane by methanogens, so that methanogens actually helped create the conditions necessary for the oxidation of the atmosphere.

=== Tectonic trigger ===
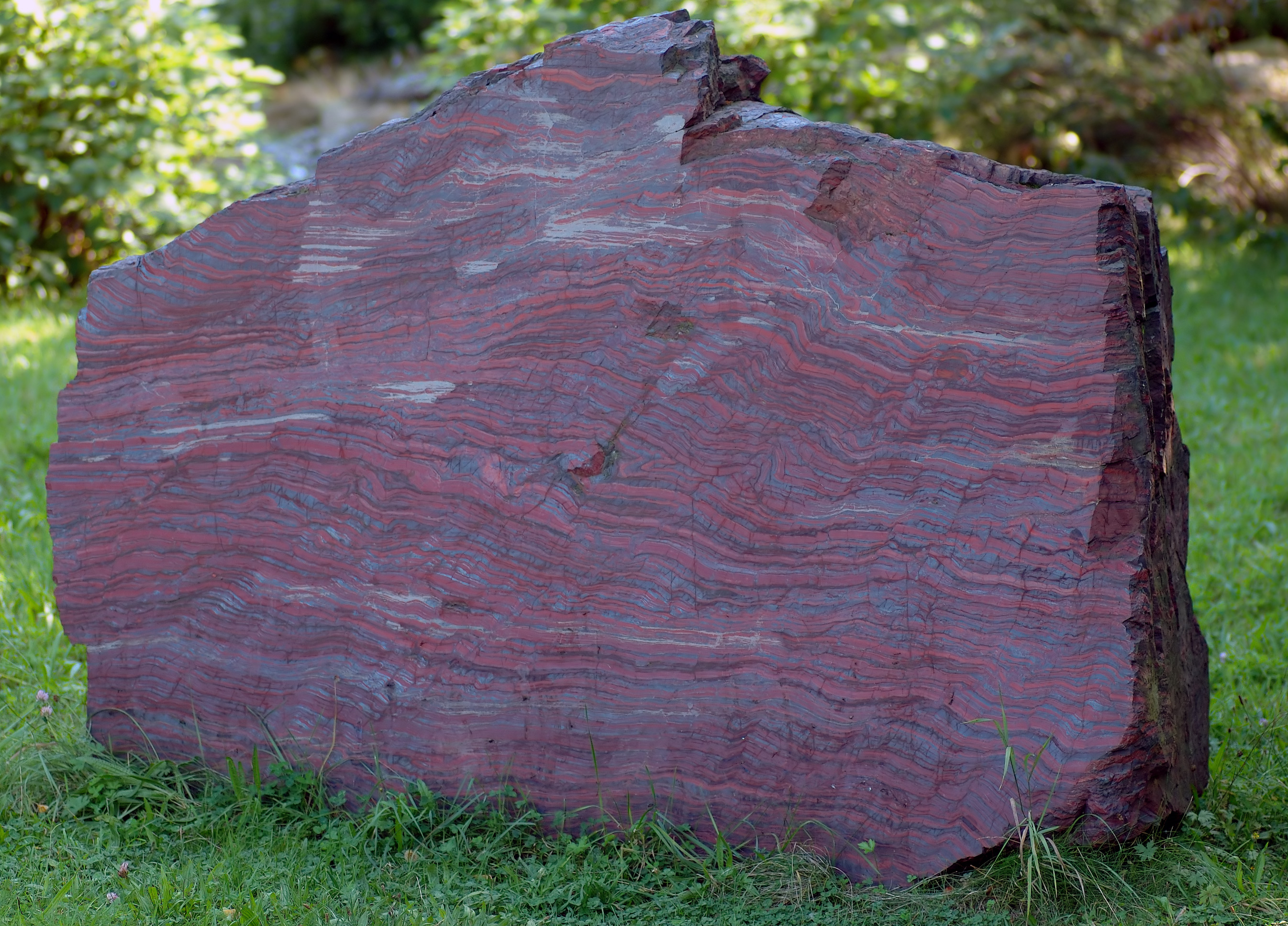
2.1 billion year old rock showing banded iron formation

One hypothesis suggests that the oxygen increase had to await tectonically driven changes in the Earth, including the appearance of shelf seas, where reduced organic carbon could reach the sediments and be buried. The burial of reduced carbon as graphite or diamond around subduction zones released molecular oxygen into the atmosphere. The appearance of oxidised magmas enriched in sulphur formed around subduction zones confirms changes in tectonic regime played an important role in the oxygenation of Earth's atmosphere.

The newly produced oxygen was first consumed in various chemical reactions in the oceans, primarily with iron. Evidence is found in older rocks that contain massive banded iron formations apparently laid down as this iron and oxygen first combined; most present-day iron ore lies in these deposits. It was assumed oxygen released from cyanobacteria resulted in the chemical reactions that created rust, but it appears the iron formations were caused by anoxygenic phototrophic iron-oxidizing bacteria, which does not require oxygen. Evidence suggests oxygen levels spiked each time smaller land masses collided to form a super-continent. Tectonic pressure thrust up mountain chains, which eroded releasing nutrients into the ocean that fed photosynthetic cyanobacteria.

=== Bistability ===
Another hypothesis posits a model of the atmosphere that exhibits bistability: two steady states of oxygen concentration. The state of stable low oxygen concentration (0.02%) experiences a high rate of methane oxidation. If some event raises oxygen levels beyond a moderate threshold, the formation of an ozone layer shields UV rays and decreases methane oxidation, raising oxygen further to a stable state of 21% or more. The Great Oxygenation Event can then be understood as a transition from the lower to the upper steady states.

=== Increasing photoperiod ===
Cyanobacteria tend to consume nearly as much oxygen at night as they produce during the day. However, experiments demonstrate that cyanobacterial mats produce a greater excess of oxygen with longer photoperiods. The rotational period of the Earth was only about six hours shortly after its formation 4.5 Ga but increased to 21 hours by 2.4 Ga in the Paleoproterozoic. The rotational period increased again, starting 700 million years ago, to its present value of 24 hours. The total amount of oxygen produced by the cyanobacteria remained the same with longer days, but the longer the day, the more time oxygen has to diffuse into the water.

=== Low-productivity trajectory ===
One group of researchers has suggested that, if certain conditions were present (a low-productivity trajectory), it may have been plants, instead of cyanobacteria, that made the greatest contribution of oxygen to the GOE.

== Consequences of oxygenation ==
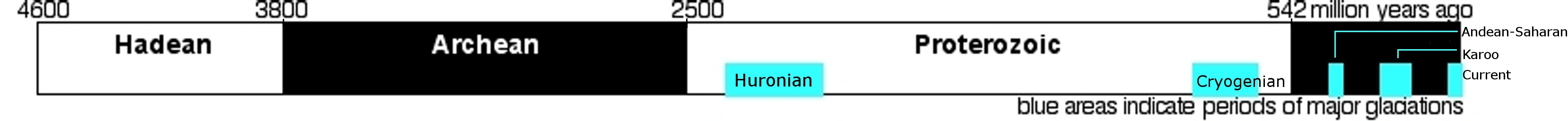
Timeline of glaciations, shown in blue

Eventually, oxygen started to accumulate in the atmosphere, with two major consequences.

- Oxygen likely oxidized atmospheric methane (a strong greenhouse gas) to carbon dioxide (a weaker one) and water. This weakened the greenhouse effect of the Earth's atmosphere, causing planetary cooling, which has been proposed to have triggered a series of ice ages known as the Huronian glaciation, bracketing an age range of 2.45–2.22 Ga.
- The increased oxygen concentrations provided a new opportunity for biological diversification, as well as tremendous changes in the nature of chemical interactions between rocks, sand, clay, and other geological substrates and the Earth's air, oceans, and other surface waters. Despite the natural recycling of organic matter, life had remained energetically limited until the widespread availability of oxygen. The availability of oxygen greatly increased the free energy available to living organisms, with global environmental impacts. For example, mitochondria evolved after the GOE, giving organisms the energy to exploit new, more complex morphologies interacting in increasingly complex ecosystems, although these did not appear until the late Proterozoic and Cambrian.

=== Mineral diversification ===
The Great Oxygenation Event triggered an explosive growth in the diversity of minerals, with many elements occurring in one or more oxidized forms near the Earth's surface. It is estimated that the GOE was directly responsible for deposition of more than 2,500 of the total of about 4,500 minerals found on Earth today. Most of these new minerals were formed as hydrated and oxidized forms due to dynamic mantle and crust processes.

Ediacaran
Cambrian
Ordovician
Devonian
Carboniferous
Permian
Triassic
Jurassic
Cretaceous
Paleogene
Neogene
Quaternary
Palæoproterozoic
Mesoproterozoic
Neoproterozoic
Palæozoic
Mesozoic
Cenozoic
│
−2500
│
−2300
│
−2100
│
−1900
│
−1700
│
−1500
│
−1300
│
−1100
│
−900
│
−700
│
−500
│
−300
│
−100
Million years ago. Age of Earth = 4,560

=== Cyanobacteria evolution ===
In field studies done in Lake Fryxell, Antarctica, scientists found that mats of oxygen-producing cyanobacteria produced a thin layer, one to two millimeters thick, of oxygenated water in an otherwise anoxic environment, even under thick ice. By inference, these organisms could have adapted to oxygen even before oxygen accumulated in the atmosphere. The evolution of such oxygen-dependent organisms eventually established an equilibrium in the availability of oxygen, which became a major constituent of the atmosphere.

=== Origin of eukaryotes ===
It has been proposed that a local rise in oxygen levels due to cyanobacterial photosynthesis in ancient microenvironments was highly toxic to the surrounding biota and that this selective pressure drove the evolutionary transformation of an archaeal lineage into the first eukaryotes. Oxidative stress involving production of reactive oxygen species (ROS) might have acted in synergy with other environmental stresses (such as ultraviolet radiation and desiccation) to drive selection in an early archaeal lineage towards eukaryosis. This archaeal ancestor may already have had DNA repair mechanisms based on DNA pairing and recombination, and possibly some cell fusion mechanism. The detrimental effects of internal ROS (produced by endosymbiont proto-mitochondria) on the archaeal genome could have promoted the evolution of meiotic sex. Selective pressure for efficient DNA repair of oxidative DNA damage may have driven the evolution of eukaryotic sex involving such features as cell-cell fusions, cytoskeleton-mediated chromosome movements, and the emergence of the nuclear membrane. Thus, the evolution of eukaryotic sex and eukaryogenesis were likely inseparable processes that largely evolved to facilitate DNA repair. The evolution of mitochondria, which are well suited for oxygenated environments, may have occurred during the GOE.

However, other authors express skepticism that the GOE resulted in widespread eukaryotic diversification due to the lack of robust evidence, concluding that the oxygenation of the oceans and atmosphere does not necessarily lead to increases in ecological and physiological diversity.

==== Lomagundi-Jatuli event ====
The rise in oxygen content was not linear: instead, there was a rise in oxygen content around 2.3 Ga, followed by a drop around 2.1 Ga. This rise in oxygen is called the Lomagundi-Jatuli event, Lomagundi event, or Lomagundi-Jatuli excursion (named for a district of Southern Rhodesia) and the time period has been termed Jatulian, which is considered to be part of the Rhyacian period. During the Lomagundi-Jatuli event, oxygen amounts in the atmosphere reached similar heights to modern levels, before returning to low levels during the following stage, which caused the deposition of black shales (rocks that contain large amounts of organic matter that would otherwise have been burned away by oxygen). This drop in oxygen levels is called the Shunga-Francevillian event. Evidence for the event has been found globally in places such as Fennoscandia and the Wyoming Craton. Oceans seem to have stayed rich in oxygen for some time even after the event ended. However, significant controversy remains regarding the Lomagundi-Jatuli event, with some suggesting could instead be the product of metabolic evolution and be only a local signature preserved in restricted depositional settings.

It has been hypothesized that eukaryotes first evolved during the Lomagundi-Jatuli event.

== See also ==
- Boring Billion – Earth history between 1.8~0.8 billion years ago, characterized by tectonic stability, climatic stasis, and a slow biological evolution with very low oxygen levels and no evidence of glaciation
- Francevillian biota – A collection of 2.1-billion-year-old Palaeoproterozoic macroscopic structures, controversially suggested to be fossils
- Neoproterozoic oxygenation event – A second major increase in Earth's oxygen levels that occurred between around 850 and 540 million years ago
- Geological history of oxygen – Timeline of the development of free oxygen in the Earth's oceans and atmosphere
- Medea hypothesis – Hypothesis that multicellular life may be self-destructive
- Pasteur point – Switch from fermentation to aerobic respiration
- Purple Earth hypothesis – Hypothesis that early photosynthesis reflected purple light
- Rare Earth hypothesis – Hypothesis that complex extraterrestrial life is an extremely rare phenomenon
- Stromatolite – Layered encrusted sedimentary structure of bacterial origin
