= Rhyacian =

Second period of the Paleoproterozoic Era

- 2300 – 2050 Ma
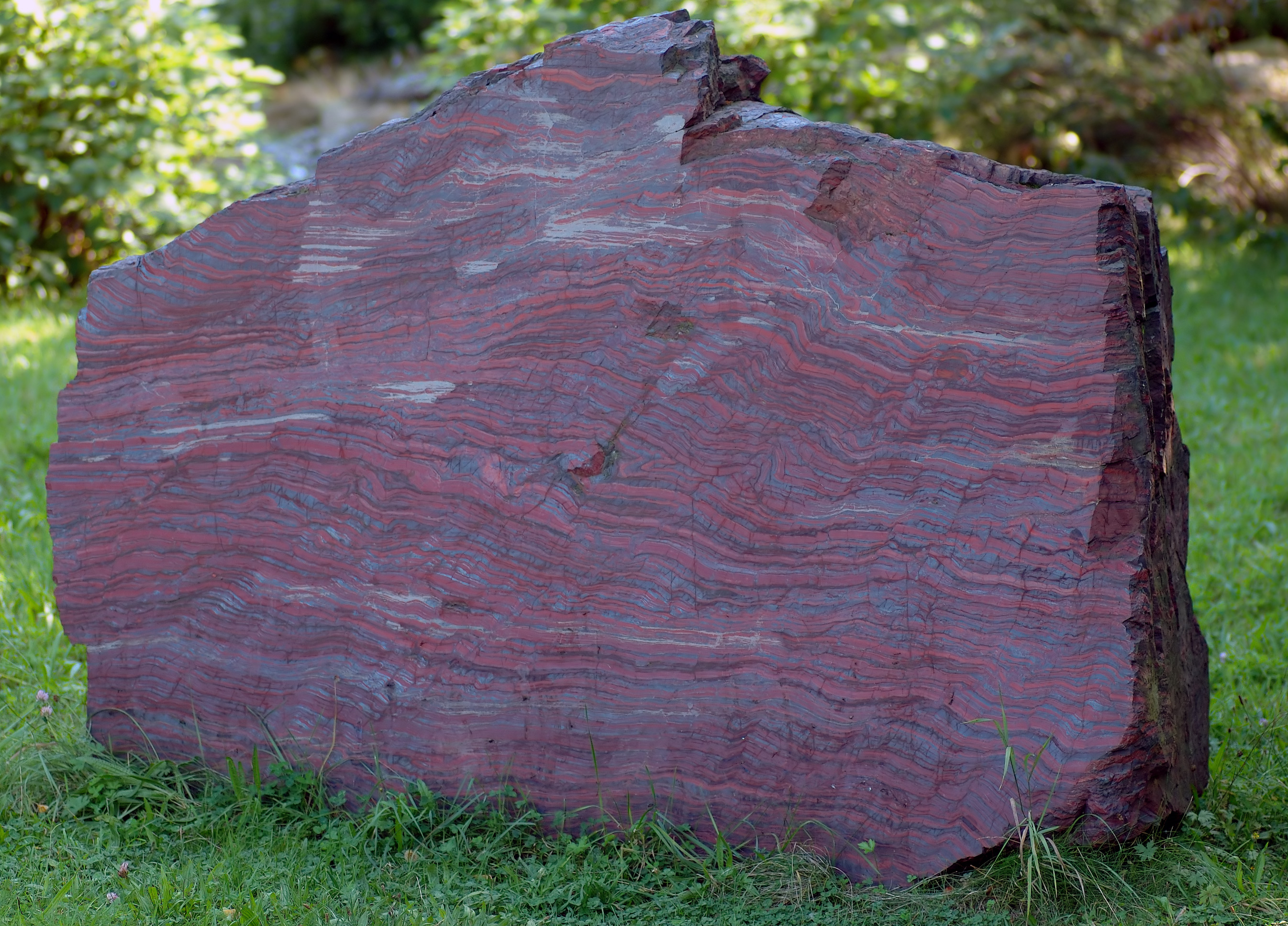
- A sample of a Rhyacian banded iron formation found in North America

Chronology
← / Francevillian biota emerges; ← / Diskagma appears; ← / Huronian glaciation
Major glacial period
Events of the Rhyacian Period; Vertical axis scale: Millions of years ago

Etymology
- Name formality: Formal

Usage information
- Celestial body: Earth
- Regional usage: Global (ICS)
- Time scale(s) used: ICS Time Scale

Definition
- Chronological unit: Period
- Stratigraphic unit: System
- Time span formality: Formal
- Lower boundary definition: Defined Chronometrically
- Lower GSSA ratified: 1990
- Upper boundary definition: Defined Chronometrically
- Upper GSSA ratified: 1990

The Rhyacian (/raɪˈeɪsiən/) is the second geologic period in the Paleoproterozoic Era. It spans 250 million years and lasted from 2300 to 2050 million years ago (Ma), following the Siderian Period and preceding the Orosirian Period. These dates are defined chronometrically rather than stratigraphically.

== Etymology and history ==
The name Rhyacian is derived from the Greek word rhyas, meaning "stream of lava", and refers to the layered intrusions of the Bushfeld Complex in South Africa. The term was proposed by the Subcommission on Precambrian Stratigraphy as a subdivision of the Proterozoic Eon, and was ratified by the International Union of Geological Sciences in 1990. In 2012, there were suggestions to replace the Rhyacian with an alternate name, bearing a time interval of 2250 to 2060 Ma, and decided on the basis of its stratigraphy. The name Jatulian was proposed in reference to the Lomagundi-Jatuli excursion event, while the term Eukaryian was chosen due to the period's existing signs of the earliest eukaryotic fossils. As of December 2024, a replacement for the Rhyacian has not been officially adopted by the IUGS. The term Jatulian, however, has been used in the regional stratigraphy of Fennoscandia.

== Paleogeography ==
The Bushveld Igneous Complex and some other similar intrusions formed during this period.

== Climate ==
The Huronian (Makganyene) global glaciation began at the start of the Siderian and lasted ~300 million years, continuing through around 40% of the Rhyacian.

== Life ==
Eukaryotes are thought to have originated during the Rhyacian, after an endosymbiotic event between asgardarchaea and alphaproteobacteria; sexual reproduction, a strategy unique to eukaryotes, is also thought to have developed during this period. Possible signs of macroscopic life have been found in Rhyacian aged rocks (2100 Mya), although these are heavily disputed due their age and probable abiotic origins.
