= Neoproterozoic oxygenation event =

Neoproterozoic surge in atmospheric oxygen

O_{2} build-up in the Earth's atmosphere. Red and green lines represent the range of the estimates while time is measured in billions of years ago (Ga).: Stage 1 (3.85–2.45 Ga): Practically no O_{2} in the atmosphere. The oceans were also largely anoxic – with the possible exception of O_{2} in the shallow oceans.; Stage 2 (2.45–1.85 Ga): O_{2} produced, rising to values of 0.02 and 0.04 atm, but absorbed in oceans and seabed rock. (Great Oxidation Event); Stage 3 (1.85–0.85 Ga): O_{2} starts to gas out of the oceans, but is absorbed by land surfaces. No significant change in oxygen level.; Stages 4 and 5 (0.85 Ga – present): Other O_{2} reservoirs filled; gas accumulates in atmosphere. Stage 4 is known as the Neoproterozoic Oxygenation event.

The Neoproterozoic Oxygenation Event (NOE), also called the "Second Great Oxidation Event", was a geologic time interval between around 850 and 540 million years ago during the Neoproterozoic era, during which the oxygen concentration in Earth's atmosphere and oceans rose significantly. Taking place after the end to the Boring Billion, a euxinic period of extremely low atmospheric oxygen spanning from the Statherian period of the Paleoproterozoic era to the Tonian period of the Neoproterozoic era, the atmospheric oxygen concentration rose from <0.1% PAL throughout most of the early/mid-Proterozoic to >13% PAL during the early Neoproterozoic from 900 to 815 Ma, and possibly up to ~50% PAL during the Cryogenian Sturtian–Marinoan interglacial.

The NOE was the second major increase in atmospheric and oceanic oxygen concentration on Earth, after the Great Oxidation Event (GOE) of the Neoarchean-Paleoproterozoic boundary. Unlike the GOE, it is unclear whether the NOE was a synchronous, global event or a series of asynchronous, regional oxygenation intervals with unrelated causes.

== Evidence for oxygenation ==
=== Carbon isotopes ===
Beginning around 850 Mya to around 720 Mya, a time interval roughly corresponding to the Late Tonian, between the end of the Boring Billion and the onset of the Cryogenian "Snowball Earth", marine deposits record a very significant positive carbon isotope excursion. These elevated δ^{13C} values are believed to be linked to an evolutionary radiation of eukaryotic plankton and enhanced organic burial, which in turn indicate a spike in oxygen production during this interval. Further positive carbon isotope excursions occurred during the Cryogenian. Although several negative carbon isotope excursions, associated with warming events, are known from the Late Tonian all the way up to the Proterozoic-Phanerozoic boundary, the carbon isotope record nonetheless maintains a noticeable positive trend throughout the Neoproterozoic.

=== Nitrogen isotopes ===
δ^{15}N data from 750 to 580 million year-old marine sediments hailing from four different Neoproterozoic basins show similar nitrogen isotope ratios to modern oceans, with a mode of +4% and a range from -4% to +11%. No significant change is observed across the Cryogenian-Ediacaran boundary, implying that oxygen was already ubiquitous in the global ocean as early as 750 Mya, during the Tonian period.

=== Sulfur isotopes ===
Seawater sulfate δ^{34}S values, which saw a gradual increase over most of the Neoproterozoic punctuated by major drops during glaciations, show a significant positive excursion during the Ediacaran, with a corresponding decrease in pyritic δ^{34}S. High fractionation rates between sulfate and sulfide indicate an increase in the availability of sulfate in the water column, which in turn is indicative of increased reaction of pyrite with oxygen. In addition, genetic evidence points to the occurrence of a radiation of non-photosynthetic sulfide-reducing bacteria during the Neoproterozoic. Through bacterial sulfur disproportionation, such bacteria further deplete marine sulfide of heavier sulfur isotopes. Because such bacteria require significant amounts of oxygen to survive, an oxygenation event during the Neoproterozoic raising oxygen concentrations to over 5-18% of modern levels is believed to have been a necessary prerequisite for the diversification of these microorganisms.

=== Strontium isotopes ===
δ^{13}C can reliably indicate changes in net primary productivity and oxygenation if the rates of weathering into the oceans and carbon dioxide outgassing remain constant or increase, since a decrease in either of these could cause a positive δ^{13}C excursion through continued preferential biological consumption of carbon-12 by existing communities while the supply of available carbon decreased, without indicating an increase in primary productivity and oxygen production. The ratio of strontium-87 to strontium-86 is used as a determinant of the relative contribution of continental weathering to the ocean's nutrient supply; an increase in this ratio, as observed throughout the Neoproterozoic and into the Cambrian until reaching a peak at the end of the Cambrian, suggests a rise in continental weathering and bolsters evidence from carbon isotope ratios for high oxygenation in this interval of time.

=== Chromium isotopes ===
Surface oxidation of Cr(III) to Cr(VI) causes isotopic fractionation of chromium; Cr(VI), typically present in the environment as either chromate or dichromate, has elevated values of δ^{53}Cr, or the ratio of chromium-53 to chromium-52, whereas bacterial reduction of Cr(VI) to Cr(III) is associated with negative chromium isotope excursions. Following the riverine transport of oxidised chromium into the ocean, the reaction reducing Cr(VI) back into Cr(III) and subsequently oxidising ferrous iron into ferric iron is highly efficient at sequestering Cr(VI), as is the precipitation of Cr(III) with ferric oxyhydroxide, meaning that chemically precipitated chromium isotope ratios in sediments abundant in ferric iron accurately reflect seawater chromium isotope ratios at the time of deposition. Because efficient oxidation of Cr(III) to Cr(VI) is only possible in the presence of the catalyst manganese dioxide, which is only stable and abundant at high oxygen fugacities, a positive excursion of δ^{53}Cr indicates an increase in atmospheric oxygen concentrations. Banded iron formations (BIFs) deposited during the Neoproterozoic consistently display highly positive δ^{53}Cr values, from 0.9% to 4.9%, demonstrating the era's oxygenation of the atmosphere. Oxidative chromium cycling began approximately 0.8 Ga, indicating that oxygen level rise began well before the Cryogenian glaciations. Chromium isotopes also show that during the Cryogenian interglacial interval, between the Sturtian and Marinoan glaciations, oxygenation of the ocean and atmosphere was slow and subdued; this interval marked a lull in the NOE.

=== Molybdenum isotopes ===
δ^{98}Mo values were slightly higher during the Late Ediacaran than in the Cryogenian or the Early and Middle Ediacaran. This isotopic proxy indicates the level of oxygenation of the Late Ediacaran ocean was comparable to that of Mesozoic oceanic anoxic events.

=== Uranium isotopes ===
The very low values of δ^{238}U, commonly used as an isotopic measurement of changes in seawater oxygenation, during much of the Neoproterozoic have been interpreted to reflect progressive oxygenation punctuated by temporary, transient expansions of anoxic and euxinic waters. During the Early Ediacaran, the shift in uranium isotopes occurred in tandem with enrichment in light carbon isotopes.

== Causes ==
=== Increase in nitrogen fixation ===
During the Boring Billion, open ocean productivity was very low compared to the Neoproterozoic and Phanerozoic as a result of the absence of planktonic nitrogen-fixing bacteria. The evolution and radiation of nitrogen-fixing bacteria and non-nitrogen-fixing picocyanobacteria capable of occupying marine planktonic niches and consequent changes to the nitrogen cycle during the Cryogenian are believed to be a culprit behind the rapid oxygenation of and removal of carbon dioxide from the atmosphere, which also helps explain the development of extremely severe glaciations that characterised this period of the Neoproterozoic.

=== Increase in day length ===
The slowdown of the Earth's rotation and corresponding increase in day length has been suggested as a possible cause of the NOE on the basis of experimental findings that cyanobacterial productivity is higher during longer periods of uninterrupted daylight compared to shorter periods more frequently interrupted by darkness. Between 650 and 500 million years ago, the Earth's rotation slowed down significantly, which overlaps with the increase in atmospheric oxygen.

=== Organic carbon burial ===
The Neoproterozoic saw organic carbon burial occur in large lakes with anoxic bottom waters on a massive scale. As carbon was locked away in sedimentary rock, it was unable to be oxidised, permitting a buildup of atmospheric oxygen.

=== Phosphorus removal ===
The increasing diversity of eukaryotes has been proposed as a cause of increased deep ocean oxygenation by means of phosphorus removal from the deep ocean. The evolution of large multicellular organisms led to increased amounts of organic matters sinking to the seafloor (marine snow). This, combined with the evolution of benthic filter feeders (e.g. choanoflagellates and primitive poriferans such as Otavia), is believed to have shifted oxygen demand further down in the water column, which would result in a positive feedback loop wherein phosphorus was removed from the ocean, which reduced productivity and decreased oxygen demand, which in turn led to increasing oxygenation of deep ocean water. Increasingly well oxygenated oceans enabled further eukaryotic dispersal, which likely acted as a positive feedback loop that accelerated oxygenation.

== Consequences ==
=== Glaciation ===
The rapid increase in organic carbon sequestration as a result of the increased rates of global photosynthesis by both cyanobacteria and eukaryotic photoautotrophs (green and red algae), occurring in conjunction with an increase in silicate weathering of continental flood basalts resulting from the breakup of the supercontinent Rodinia, is believed to have been a trigger of the Sturtian and Marinoan glaciations during the Cryogenian, the middle period of the Neoproterozoic.

=== Biological diversity ===
During the Tonian, very early multicellular organisms may have evolved and diversified in oxygen "oases" in the deep oceans, which acted as cradles in these early stages of eukaryote evolution. However, the persistence of anoxia and euxinia over the late Tonian despite some increases in oxygen content meant eukaryotic diversity overall remained low. Over the course of the Ediacaran period, the oceans gradually became better oxygenated, with the time interval immediately after the Gaskiers Glaciation displaying evidence of significantly increasing marine oxygen content. The rapid diversification of multicellular life during this geologic period has been attributed by some authors to an increase in oxygen content, enabling the iconic oxygen-consuming multicellular eukaryotes of the Ediacaran biota to become ubiquitous and widespread. Initially restricted to deeper, colder waters that possessed the most dissolved oxygen, metazoan life gradually expanded into warmer zones of the ocean as global oxygen levels rose.

== See also ==
- Great Oxidation Event
- Avalon explosion
- Cambrian explosion
- Silurian-Devonian Terrestrial Revolution
