= Adelaide Superbasin =

Major geological province in Australia

- Adelaide Geosyncline; Adelaide Rift Complex

- An outline of both the known and potential extent of the Adelaide Superbasin
- Coordinates: 33°41′S 138°44′E
- Country: Australia
- State(s): South Australia; New South Wales; Victoria
- Cities: Adelaide

Geology
- Basin type: Rift; Passive margin
- Plate: Australian
- Orogeny: Delamerian; Alice Springs; Sprigg
- Age: Neoproterozoic-Cambrian
- Stratigraphy: Stratigraphy
- Faults: Paralana; Norwest; Anabama-Redan

The Adelaide Superbasin (previously known as the Adelaide Geosyncline and Adelaide Rift Complex) is a major Neoproterozoic to middle Cambrian geological province in central and south-east South Australia, western New South Wales, and western Victoria. It consists of a thick pile of sedimentary rocks and minor volcanic rocks that were deposited on the eastern margin of the Australian continent during the time of breakup of the supercontinent Rodinia. The Adelaide Superbasin has been the subject of much research, as it contains geological evidence for the breakup of Rodinia; two Snowball Earth events (the Sturtian and Marinoan glaciations); the Neoproterozoic oxygenation event, the transition to mostly eukaryotic life; and the Ediacaran Fauna.

== Overview ==
The Adelaide Superbasin has been previously called the Adelaide Geosyncline (Mawson & Sprigg (1987); Preiss (2000)) and the Adelaide Rift Complex (Veevers et al. (1997).

This geological province consists of a thick pile of sedimentary rocks and minor volcanic rocks that were deposited on the eastern margin of Australia during the time of breakup of the supercontinent Rodinia. A number of authors have noted the similarity in these sedimentary rocks with rocks found in western North America and have suggested that they were formerly adjacent to each other in Rodinia. This is one major correlation in the SWEAT (south-west USA against East Antarctica) reconstruction of Rodinia.

== Geography ==
North–south it stretches over 850 km (530 mi) from the Peake and Denison Ranges in the central-north of South Australia down through the Flinders Ranges and Mount Lofty Ranges, narrowing at the Fleurieu Peninsula and extending onto Kangaroo Island. West–east it stretches about 700 km (430 mi) from the eastern margin of Lake Gairdner across to the Barrier Ranges of New South Wales. The true northern and eastern extent of the Adelaide Superbasin is not well known due to much of the basin being buried beneath younger basins, including the Murray Basin, and is the subject of current research.

It is thought that the Moyston Fault in Victoria marks the eastern boundary and the northern extension may continue underneath and potentially include the Warburton Basin; however, this remains speculative. Most of the outcropping rock today is within the two major mountain ranges of South Australia: the Flinders Ranges and the Mount Lofty Ranges.

Much like the partly coeval Centralian Superbasin it contains several named basins and sub-basins. The oldest and largest of these is the Adelaide Rift Complex, with the adjoining and relatively undeformed Stuart Shelf, Torrens Hinge Zone and Coombalarnie Platform making up the remaining Neoproterozoic provinces. The Stansbury Basin (including its sub-province the Kanmantoo Province/Trough) and Arrowie Basin (including its sub-province the Yalkalpo Sub-basin) are the two known Cambrian provinces within the Adelaide Superbasin.

== Geologic history ==
Deposition in the Adelaide Superbasin began just prior to 830 Ma as Laurentia (and possibly an intervening continent, see Rodinia for alternative reconstructions) began to rift away from Australia during the breakup of the supercontinent Rodinia. Deposition continued through to the Delamerian Orogeny c. 514–490 Ma at which time deposition in the Adelaide Superbasin stopped and the rocks were folded and deformed. Initially, deposition occurred from gradual subsidence of peneplained cratonic lithosphere before developing into a rift basin.

After about 725 Ma, deposition continued in a mostly passive margin setting along the western edge of the Palaeo-Pacific Ocean, with renewed rifting during the Ediacaran to the east (present day) of the main depocentres until being terminated by the Delamerian Orogeny. The most abundant rock types indicate a transition from evaporitic depositional environments through to proximal marine, glacial and marine depositional environments. The thickest parts of the stratigraphy reach a total cumulative thickness of about 24,000 m.

=== Notable events ===
Particularly notable events that are preserved in the rock record of the Adelaide Superbasin are the two Neoproterozoic Snowball Earth events (the Sturtian and Marinoan Glaciations), the Neoproterozoic Oxygenation Event, the Ediacaran Acraman bolide ejecta layer and the rise of Ediacaran Fauna.

== Basin subdivision ==
The Adelaide Superbasin composed of several named basins and sub-basins. In total there are currently eight defined basins/sub-basins within the Adelaide Superbasin.

Known extents of the subdivisions of the Adelaide Superbasin for both the Neoproterozoic and Cambrian

=== Adelaide Rift Complex ===
The Adelaide Rift Complex is the oldest and most central part of the Adelaide Superbasin. It is a series of rift troughs and passive margins basins with protracted development from c. 840 Ma to c. 550 Ma with the top of the sedimentary sequence marked by a major basin-wide disconformity separating it from the Cambrian Arrowie and Stansbury Basins.

=== Torrens Hinge Zone ===
The Torrens Hinge Zone is a transitional area between the relatively undeformed platform deposits of the Stuart Shelf and the deformed rocks of the central Adelaide Rift Complex. It runs along the western margin of the primary rift basin.

=== Stuart Shelf ===
The Stuart Shelf is a region of platform deposits on the western rift shoulder that overlies the Gawler craton. It experienced deposition in the late Neoproterozoic after the Sturtian Glaciation during a period of marine transgression and remains relatively undeformed to this day.

=== Coombalarnie Platform ===
The Coombalarnie Platform, like the Stuart Shelf, is a region of platform deposits; however, it overlies the Curnamona Province to the north-east of the main depocentre. Deposition occurred only after a major marine transgression event during the late Neoproterozoic after the Sturtian Glaciation.

=== Stansbury Basin ===
The Stansbury Basin is one of the two known Cambrian basins of the Adelaide Superbasin. It is exposed in the south of the superbasin, extending from Kangaroo Island and the Mount Lofty Ranges toward Victoria underneath the Murray Basin. The true eastward extent of this basin is not well understood and is a focus of current geological research in South Australia. It is likely that deposition was continuous with the Arrowie Basin to the north.

==== Kanmantoo Province ====
The Kanmantoo Province (also Kanmantoo Trough) is a deeply subsident rift formed in early Cambrian. It forms the eastern and southern portion of the Stansbury Basin, extending to the Glenelg River region of Victoria. Most rocks were highly deformed and experienced moderate to high grade metamorphism during the Delamerian Orogeny.

=== Arrowie Basin ===
The Arrowie Basin is second of the two known Cambrian basins of the Adelaide Superbasin. It extends from the Stuart Shelf in the west across the Flinders Ranges to western New South Wales where it forms part of the Neoproterozoic–Cambrian cover on the Curnamona Province.

==== Yalkalpo Sub-basin ====
The Yalkalpo Sub-basin is the easternmost part of the Arrowie Basin. Its western boundary is the basement high Benagerie Ridge of the Curnamona Province.

== Lithostratigraphy ==
The lithostratigraphy of the Adelaide Superbasin is divided into three supergroups with further division into numerous groups and subgroups and over 140 formations.

Generalised Lithostratigraphy of the Adelaide Superbasin
Geochronology				South Australia			New South Wales	
Eon	Era	Period	Local Chronostratigraphy (historical – not in use)	Supergroup	Groups	Subgroups	Groups	Subgroups
Phanerozoic	Palaeozoic	Cambrian	Unconformity overlaid by Permian glacial sediments					
Phanerozoic	Palaeozoic	Cambrian	Mid-late	Moralana Supergroup	Lake Frome Group / Kanmantoo Group / Yorke Group			
Phanerozoic	Palaeozoic	Cambrian	Early	Moralana Supergroup	Kanmantoo Group / Yorke Group / Kangaroo Island Group	Keynes Subgroup / Bollaparudda Subgroup		
Phanerozoic	Palaeozoic	Cambrian	Early	Moralana Supergroup	Normanville Group / Hawker Group / Pavy Group / Kangaroo Island Group			
Phanerozoic	Palaeozoic	Cambrian	Early	Unconformity				
Proterozoic	Neoproterozoic	Ediacaran	Marinoan	Heysen Supergroup	Wilpena Group	Pound Subgroup	Farnell Group	
Proterozoic	Neoproterozoic	Ediacaran	Marinoan	Heysen Supergroup	Wilpena Group	Depot Springs Subgroup	Farnell Group	
Proterozoic	Neoproterozoic	Ediacaran	Marinoan	Heysen Supergroup	Wilpena Group	Aruhna Subgroup	Farnell Group	
Proterozoic	Neoproterozoic	Ediacaran	Marinoan	Heysen Supergroup	Wilpena Group	Sandison Subgroup	Farnell Group	
Proterozoic	Neoproterozoic	Ediacaran	Marinoan	Heysen Supergroup	Unconformity			
Proterozoic	Neoproterozoic	Cryogenian	Marinoan	Heysen Supergroup	Umberatana Group	Yerelina Subgroup	Toorrowangee Group	Teamsters Creek Subgroup
Proterozoic	Neoproterozoic	Cryogenian	Marinoan	Heysen Supergroup	Umberatana Group	Upalinna Subgroup	Toorrowangee Group	Teamsters Creek Subgroup
Proterozoic	Neoproterozoic	Cryogenian	Marinoan	Heysen Supergroup	Umberatana Group	Unconformity	Toorrowangee Group	Euriowie Subgroup
Proterozoic	Neoproterozoic	Cryogenian	Sturtian	Heysen Supergroup	Umberatana Group	Nepouie Subgroup	Toorrowangee Group	Euriowie Subgroup
Proterozoic	Neoproterozoic	Cryogenian	Sturtian	Heysen Supergroup	Umberatana Group	Unconformity	Toorrowangee Group	Unconformity
Proterozoic	Neoproterozoic	Cryogenian	Sturtian	Heysen Supergroup	Umberatana Group	Yudnamutana Subgroup	Toorrowangee Group	Yancowinna Subgroup
Proterozoic	Neoproterozoic	Cryogenian	Sturtian	Unconformity				
Proterozoic	Neoproterozoic	Tonian	Sturtian	Warrina Supergroup	Burra Group	Belair Subgroup	Unconformity	
Proterozoic	Neoproterozoic	Tonian	Torrensian	Warrina Supergroup	Burra Group	Bungarider Subgroup	Unconformity	
Proterozoic	Neoproterozoic	Tonian	Torrensian	Warrina Supergroup	Burra Group	Mundallio Subgroup	Unconformity	
Proterozoic	Neoproterozoic	Tonian	Torrensian	Warrina Supergroup	Burra Group	Emeroo Subgroup	Unconformity	
Proterozoic	Neoproterozoic	Tonian	Torrensian	Warrina Supergroup	Unconformity			
Proterozoic	Neoproterozoic	Tonian	Willouran	Warrina Supergroup	Callanna Group	Curdimurka Subgroup	Poolamacca Group	Unconformity
Proterozoic	Neoproterozoic	Tonian	Willouran	Warrina Supergroup	Callanna Group	Arkaroola Subgroup	Poolamacca Group	Wendalpa Subgroup / Pintapah Subgroup
Proterozoic	Mesoproterozoic	Unconformity underlain by metamorphosed Mesoproterozoic basement (Gawler craton, Curnamona Province)						

== Delamerian orogeny ==
Sedimentation in the Adelaide Superbasin ended in the middle Cambrian, when tectonic inversion occurred along the eastern margin of Neoproterozoic and Cambrian cratonic Australia and the margin became a subduction zone of the Palaeo-Pacific. After this time the region experienced an orogeny (mountain-building period) extending into the Ordovician. Foden et al. (2006) suggest that this orogeny lasted from ~514 Ma to 490 Ma. This event is called the Delamerian Orogeny, named after Delamere, a small town on the Fleurieu Peninsula where evidence was found for the event. The orogeny caused substantial folding, buckling, and faulting of the strata, and resulted in the creation of a major mountain range, the eroded stumps of which can today be seen as the Mount Lofty and Flinders Ranges. Not all of the basin experienced tectonic activity; the deposits on the Stuart Shelf and Coombalarnie Platform to the north-west and north-east remained undisturbed (and still do today).

Accompanying this folding and faulting were several intrusions: the granites at Victor Harbor were intruded at this time, as were those at Palmer in the eastern South Mount Lofty Ranges.

== Fossil content ==
Fossils of the earliest Animalia are found in the Adelaide Superbasin. The first of these might be the probable sponges found in the Trezona Formation, although the first confirmed Animalia are the world-renowned Ediacaran fauna, named for the Ediacara Hills where they were first discovered in South Australia in 1946. They occur at the end of the Neoproterozoic, and in 2004 the location gave its name to the last geological period of the era, the Ediacaran.

== Research ==
The Adelaide Superbasin has been the subject of much research, as it contains geological evidence for the breakup of Rodinia, two Snowball Earth events, the transition to mostly eukaryotic life, and the Ediacaran Fauna. The Cambrian successions, especially in the Flinders Ranges, include "the best exposed and most complete lower Cambrian succession of Gondwanaland". These rocks lie over rocks of the Ediacaran, which provides the ability to study the transition from Ediacaran biota to Cambrian life, the so-called "Cambrian explosion". Since the first fossils were discovered on the Yorke Peninsula in 1878, much work has been done in identifying archaeocyath and trilobite fossils of the Cambrian by naturalists, geologists, students, and others. These include Ralph Tate (1840-1901), R.L. Etheridge Junior (1846-1920), Walter Howchin (1845-1937), Edgeworth David (1858-1934), Robert Bedford (1874-1951), Thomas Griffith Taylor (1880-1963), Douglas Mawson (1882–1958), Cecil Madigan (1889-1947), and R. C. Sprigg (1919-1994).

== Recent geological history ==
The ranges formed during the Delamerian orogeny continue to erode, and intra-plate subsidence is occurring. In the South Mount Lofty Ranges this has resulted in rifting and the formation of graben structures, creating the long parallel faults which shape the Adelaide Plains; reactivation of these reverse faults has resulted in the continuing uplift of the Mount Lofty and Flinders Ranges during the Sprigg Orogeny (Miocene – present).

== See also ==
- Geological Survey of South Australia (GSSA)
- Geology of Australia
- Geology of South Australia
- Geoscience Australia
