= Cap carbonate =

Carbonate sedimentary rocks located in the upper layer of a sequence

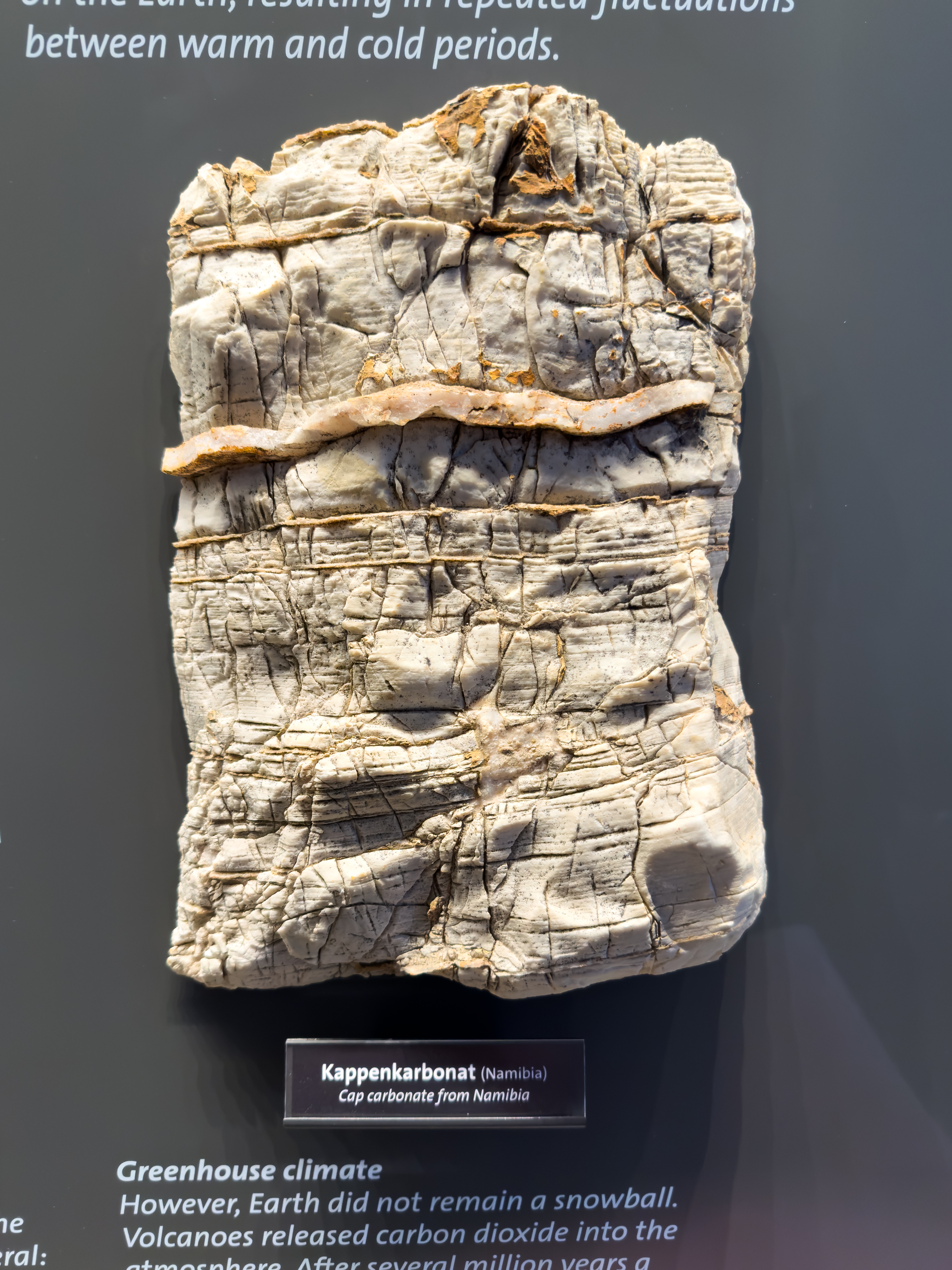
Cap carbonate from Namibia on display at Natural History Museum, Vienna

Cap carbonates are layers of distinctively textured carbonate rocks (either limestone or dolomite) that occur at the uppermost layer of sedimentary sequences reflecting major glaciations in the geological record.

== Characteristics and occurrence ==
Cap carbonates are found on most continents. They are typically 3–30 meters thick, laminated structures. They are depleted in ^{13}C compared to other carbonates. The progression of late Neoproterozoic glaciations portrayed by substantial δ^{13}C deviations in cap carbonates suggest out of control ice albedo.

Experiments have been performed to see if the massive abiotic carbonate is possible in extreme environments.

== Formation theories ==
There are several different hypotheses for cap carbonate formation.

=== Physical stratification ===
Physical stratification results in a strong carbon isotopic gradient in the ocean. Massive carbonates will precipitate when the postglacial upwelling carries the alkalinity and isotopically light carbon to the continents. In this model, cap carbonates is the by-product of continental flooding.

=== Snowball Earth ===
The short-lived change in carbon isotopic composition is the foundation for this theory. In the snowball Earth episode, the surface ocean of Earth is covered by the sea ice that separates the ocean and the atmospheric CO_{2} reservoirs. The atmospheric CO_{2} then built up to ~100,000 ppm and triggered the rapid deglaciation and melting of the sea ice, which reconnects the ocean and the atmosphere and provides excess alkalinity to the ocean. The transport of carbon dioxide from that atmosphere to the ocean will lead to carbonate precipitation. This is caused by mixing upwelling, isotopically-depleted, alkaline bottom water and calcium-rich surface water.

=== Methane clathrate formation ===
A third theory for cap carbonate formation is that methane hydrate destabilization results in the formation of cap carbonate and strongly negative carbon anomalies The unusual fabrics within the cap carbonate is similar to carbonate fabrics as from cold methane seeps.

== See also ==
- Marinoan glaciation
- Sturtian glaciation
- Boundaries of the Ediacaran Period
- Katanga Supergroup
