= Varanger =

Varanger may refer to:

- Varanger Peninsula of Norway
- Cryogenian (also called Varanger glaciation)
