= Gaskiers glaciation =

Last major glacial event of the Precambrian

Proterozoic snowball periods
Neoproterozoic era; Snowball Earth
Estimate of Proterozoic glacial periods. (Note: Dating of pre-Gaskiers glaciations is uncertain. As for the Kaigas, its very existence is doubted by some. The Huronian glaciation is not shown; there is a lack of any significant evidence for a Snowball Earth during the time period.); Vertical axis: millions of years ago

The Gaskiers glaciation is a period of widespread glacial deposits (e.g. diamictites) that lasted around 250,000 years, between 579.88 ± 0.44 and 579.63 ± 0.15 million years ago — i.e. late in the Ediacaran Period — making it the last major glacial event of the Proterozoic. It was also the last and the shortest of at least three major ice ages in the Neoproterozoic era. It is assumed that, in contrast to the Sturtian and Marinoan glaciations, it did not lead to global glaciation ("Snowball Earth").

Deposits attributed to the Gaskiers — assuming that they were all deposited at the same time — have been found on eight separate paleocontinents, in some cases occurring close to the equator (at a latitude of 10–30°). The 300-metre-thick (984 ft) name-bearing section at Gaskiers (Newfoundland) is packed full of striated dropstones. Its δ^{13}C values are very low (pushing 8‰), consistent with a period of environmental abnormality. The bed lies just below some of the oldest fossils of the Ediacaran biota, leading to early suggestions that the passing of the glaciation and the subsequent sharp rise in the oxygen levels in the ocean may have paved the way for the evolution of these odd organisms. More accurate dating methods have shown that there is a 9-million-year gap between the diamictites and the 570 million year old macrofossils.

The Bou-Azzer glaciation, an Ediacaran glaciation known from evidence collected from the West African Craton, may be equivalent to the Gaskiers glaciation. Alternatively, it has also been suggested to have been part of a glacial event later in the Ediacaran.
