= Reusch's Moraine =

Diamictite in northern Norway

Coordinates: 70°07′15″N 28°49′05″E

The Smalfjord diamictite, Bigganjargga Tillite or Reusch's Moraine is a diamictite in Finnmark, northern Norway. The rock was first identified as a tillite by Hans Reusch in 1891, hence its name. The tillite overlies sandstone whose contact surface is striated. Reusch's Moraine belongs to the Smalfjord Formation, a geological formation of Neoproterozoic age. The tillite possibly formed during the Sturtian glaciation in connection to a global glaciation.

Reusch's Moraine was among the first sites discovered to bear evidence of Precambrian glaciations, being only preceded by findings in Scotland (1871), Australia (1884) and India (1887). The site is remarkably illustrative and Reusch's 1891 sketch has been labeled "iconic" by Paul F. Hoffman. The area has been protected by law at least since the 1960s and it is forbidden to hammer the rocks.

== Differing interpretations ==
While the idea that the rocks and striations are of glacial origin have been endorsed by numerous geologists, a few have disagreed. As early as 1900 did A. Dal question the glacial origin. In the 1960s other geologists followed suit and challenged the established interpretation. A 1964 study by J.C. Crowell proposed the diamictite to be a mudflow deposit and the striations to be caused also by a mudflow. In 1966 Reading and Walker attacked the mudflow interpretation on the grounds that evidence for contemporary deformation, an expected feature of mudflow deposits, is lacking. The glacial origin idea has been aided by the fact that the diamicton deposited during a period when the Earth was subject to a widespread glaciation.

New arguments against a glacial origin were put forward in 1996 by Jensen and Wulff. They argued that the underlying sandstone is not substantially older than the diamicton and that it was not fully consolidated when the striations were made. This argument is based on their findings of imprints of diamictite clasts and diamictite clasts within the sandstone. The same authors claim that the fact that the clasts of the diamicton are locally derived argues against a glacial origin. As such Jensen and Wulff concluded the diamictite is a debris flow deposit. Countering these argument M.B. Edwards claims that if the sandstone was unconsolidated then the size of the clasts seen in the imprints would have formed much deeper grooves during striation. Edwards adds further that tills made up of locally derived clasts are nothing rare in the geological record.
