= Sturtian glaciation =

Glacial Snowball Earth event about 700 million years ago

Proterozoic snowball periods
Neoproterozoic era; Snowball Earth
Estimate of Proterozoic glacial periods. (Note: Dating of pre-Gaskiers glaciations is uncertain. As for the Kaigas, its very existence is doubted by some. The Huronian glaciation is not shown; there is a lack of any significant evidence for a Snowball Earth during the time period.); Vertical axis: millions of years ago

The Sturtian glaciation, also known as the Sturt glaciation, was a worldwide glaciation during the Cryogenian Period when the Earth experienced repeated large-scale glaciations. The Sturtian glaciation is thought to have lasted from c. 717 Ma to c. 660 Ma, a time span of approximately 57 million years. It is hypothesised to have been a Snowball Earth event, or contrastingly multiple regional glaciations, and is the longest and most severe known glacial event preserved in the geologic record after the much earlier Huronian glaciation.

== Etymology of name ==
Ultimately, current usage of the term is in reference to the globally significant Sturt Formation (originally Sturtian Tillite) within the Adelaide Superbasin of Australia. The Sturt Formation is named after Sturt Gorge, South Australia; itself named after the Sturt River, which was given its name in April 1831 by British Military Officer Captain Collet Barker, after fellow officer and explorer Charles Sturt.

The Sturtian glaciation, also known as Sturt glaciation, is an informal, but commonly used name for the older of two worldwide glacial events (the other is known as the Marinoan/Elatina glaciation) preserved in Cryogenian rocks. The term Sturtian was originally defined by Douglas Mawson and Reg Sprigg in 1950 as a chronostratigraphic unit (Series), and later proposed as an international chronostratigraphic division; however, this has been superseded by international nomenclature. The suggestion of the glacial nature of the Sturt Formation during the early 20th century resulted in discussion about Neoproterozoic glaciations (thought to be Cambrian at the time) and encouraged the research that eventually resulted in the Snowball Earth hypothesis.

== Timeline ==
The Sturtian glaciation is thought to have lasted from c. 717 Ma to c. 660 Ma, a time span of approximately 57 million years.

== Geology ==
Rocks preserving evidence for the Sturtian Glaciation are found on every continent. Notable sections are found in Australia, Canada, China, Ethiopia, Namibia, Siberia, and Svalbard.

According to Eyles and Young, "Glaciogenic rocks figure prominently in the Neoproterozoic stratigraphy of southeastern Australia and the northern Canadian Cordillera. The Sturtian glaciogenic succession (c. 740 Ma) unconformably overlies rocks of the Burra Group." The Sturtian succession includes two major diamictite-mudstone sequences which represent glacial advance and retreat cycles. It is stratigraphically correlated with the Rapitan Group of North America.

Reusch's Moraine in northern Norway may have been deposited during this period.

In 2024 researchers at the University of Adelaide and University of Sydney, using a combination of known geological formations from the Cryogenian Period and plate tectonic modelling, using EarthByte computer models, proposed the low temperature was the result of low levels of CO_{2} degassing along mid-ocean ridges, the result of the break-up of the supercontinent Rodinia.

The duration of the ice sheet advance at the start of the Sturtian glaciation lasted for less than a million years.

== Effects on life ==
In the aftermath of the Sturtian glaciation, biomarkers and body fossils indicate an increase in biological complexity.

== See also ==
- Adelaide Superbasin
- Franklin Large Igneous Province
- Port Askaig Tillite Formation - a possible correlative in the Dalradian Supergroup of Ireland and Scotland
