= Marinoan glaciation =

Period of worldwide glaciation during the Cryogenian period

Proterozoic snowball periods
Neoproterozoic era; Snowball Earth
Estimate of Proterozoic glacial periods. (Note: Dating of pre-Gaskiers glaciations is uncertain. As for the Kaigas, its very existence is doubted by some. The Huronian glaciation is not shown; there is a lack of any significant evidence for a Snowball Earth during the time period.); Vertical axis: millions of years ago

The Marinoan glaciation (also known as the Varanger glaciation, or Elatina glaciation) was a period of worldwide glaciation during the Cryogenian period. It was named after the Adelaide suburb of Marino by Douglas Mawson and Reg Sprigg in 1950. The timing and duration of the glaciation are poorly constrained, but a 2025 paper dates it to between 639 and 635 Ma (million years ago). The end of the glaciation was caused by volcanic release of carbon dioxide and dissolution of clathrate hydrates and may have been hastened by the release of methane from equatorial permafrost.

== Origin of name and history of terminology ==
The name is derived from the stratigraphic terminology of the Adelaide Superbasin (Adelaide Rift Complex) in South Australia and is taken from the Adelaide suburb of Marino. The term Marinoan Series was first used in a 1950 paper by Douglas Mawson and Reg Sprigg to subdivide the Neoproterozoic rocks of the Adelaide area, and encompassed all strata from the top of the Brighton Limestone to the base of the Cambrian. The corresponding time period, referred to as the Marinoan Epoch, spanned from the middle Cryogenian to the top of the Ediacaran in modern terminology. Mawson recognised a glacial episode within the Marinoan Epoch which he referred to as the Elatina glaciation after the Elatina Tillite (now Elatina Formation) where he found the evidence. However, the term Marinoan glaciation came into common usage because it was the glaciation that occurred during the Marinoan Epoch, as distinct from the earlier glaciation during the Sturtian Epoch (the time period of deposition of the older Sturtian Series). The term "Elatina glaciation" is, however, still used today, for the period beginning around 640 Mya. Evidence for this period is found in Enorama Creek and other areas in the Ikara-Flinders Ranges National Park, in the Flinders Ranges of South Australia.

The term Marinoan glaciation was later applied globally to any glaciogenic formations assumed (directly or indirectly) to correlate with Mawson's original Elatina glaciation in South Australia. Recently, there has been a move to return to the term Elatina glaciation in South Australia because of uncertainties regarding global correlation and because an Ediacaran glacial episode (Gaskiers) also occurs within the wide-ranging Marinoan Epoch.

== Cryogenian Snowball Earth ==
Emerging evidence suggests that the Earth underwent a number of glaciations during the Neoproterozoic era. There were three (or possibly four) significant ice ages during the late Neoproterozoic. These periods of nearly complete glaciation of Earth are often referred to as "Snowball Earth", where it is hypothesized that at times the planet was covered by ice 1–2 km (0.62–1.24 mi) thick. Of these glaciations, the Sturtian glaciation was the most significant, whereas the Marinoan was a shorter, but still worldwide glaciation. Other Cryogenian glaciations were probably small and not global as compared to the Marinoan or Sturtian glaciations.

During the Marinoan glaciation, characteristic glacial deposits indicate that Earth suffered one of the most severe ice ages in its history. Glaciers extended and contracted in a series of rhythmic pulses, possibly reaching as far as the equator.

The Earth may not have been fully covered in ice, as some computer simulations show an extreme slowdown of the hydrological cycle that inhibited new glacial formation before the Earth was fully ice-covered.

The melting of the Snowball Earth is associated with greenhouse warming due to the accumulation of high levels of carbon dioxide in the atmosphere. Deglaciation likely started in the mid-latitudes, as in the tropics, the intense hydrological cycle replenished snow rapidly. As the mid-latitudes became ice free, dust was blown from them into other regions, lowering albedo and speeding up deglaciation.

== Evidence ==
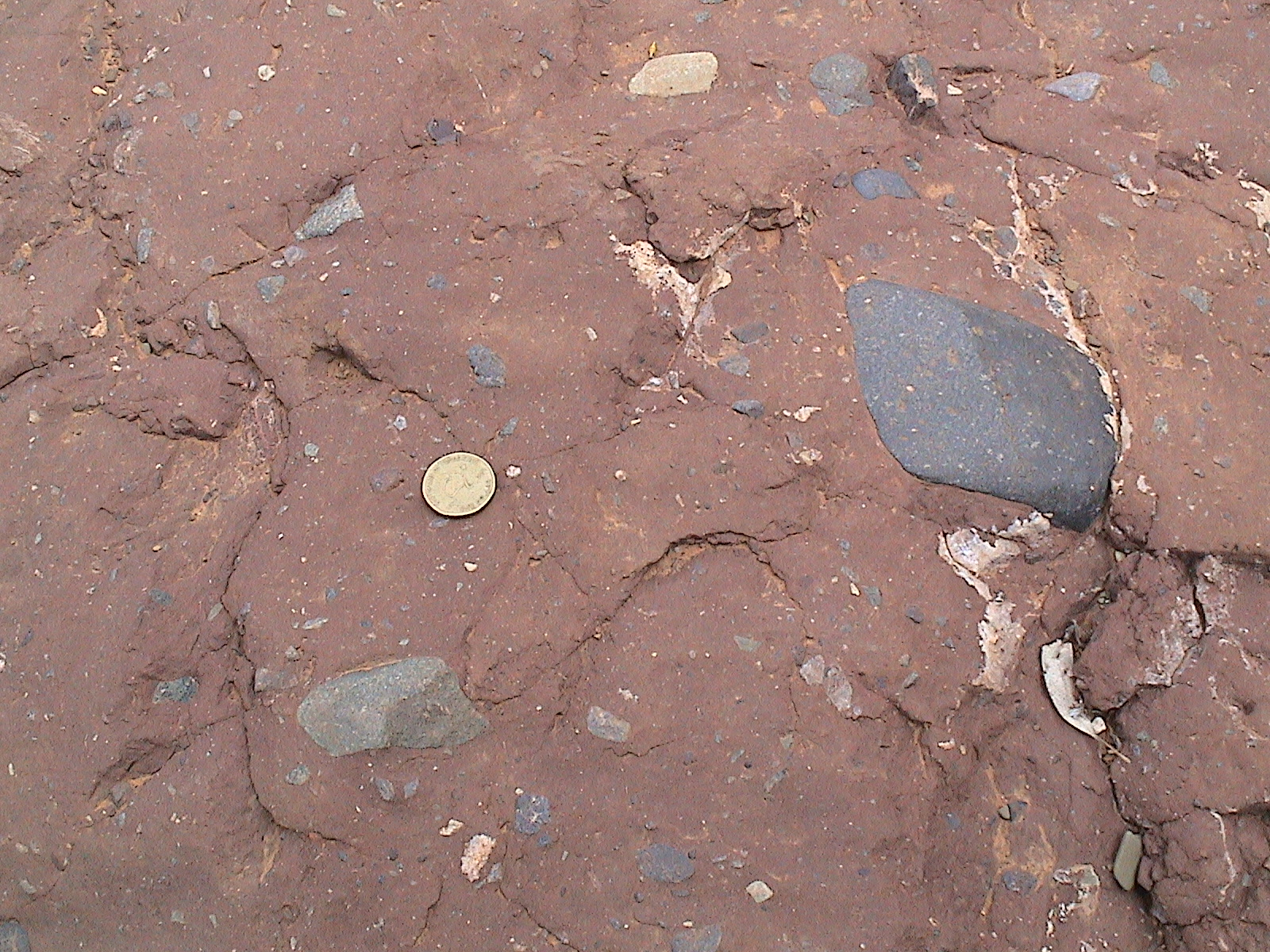
Elatina Fm diamictite below Ediacaran GSSP site in the Flinders Ranges NP, South Australia. A$1 coin for scale.

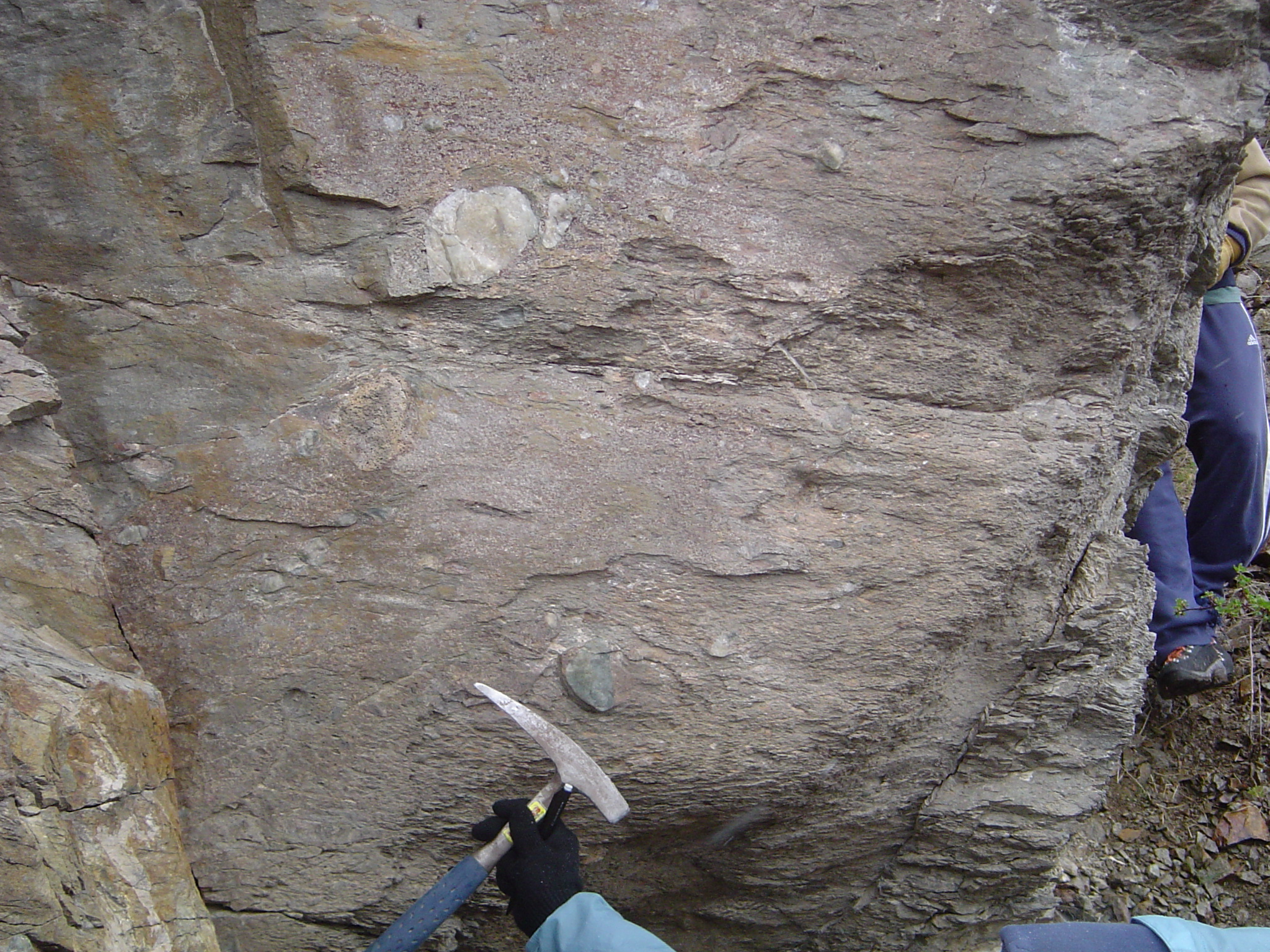
Diamictite of the Neoproterozoic Pocatello Formation, a 'Snowball Earth'—type deposit

Even though much evidence has been lost through geological changes, field investigations show evidence of the Marinoan glaciation in China, Svalbard archipelago and South Australia. In Guizhou Province, China, glacial rocks were found to be underlying and overlying a layer of volcanic ashes which contained zircon minerals, which could be dated through radioisotopes. Glacial deposits in South Australia are approximately the same age (about 630 Ma), confirmed by similar stable carbon isotopes, mineral deposits (including sedimentary baryte), and other unusual sedimentary structures. Two diamictite-rich layers in the top 1 km (0.62 mi) of the 7 km (4.3 mi) Neoproterozoic strata of the northeastern Svalbard archipelago represent the first and final phases of the Marinoan glaciation. In Uruguay, evidence of the Marinoan glaciation is known from dropstones, diamictites, rhythmites, clast layers, and varve-like deposits.

According to Eyles and Young, the Marinoan is a second episode of Neoproterozoic glaciation (680–690 Ma) occurring in the Adelaide Geosyncline. According to them, "It is separated from the Sturtian by a thick succession of sedimentary rocks containing no evidence of glaciation. This glacial phase could correspond to the recently described Ice Brooke formation in the northern Cordillera."

== Effects on life ==
The survival of benthic macroalgae indicates that there remained areas of suitable habitat for them in the photic zone along the coasts of mid-latitude continents during the Marinoan glaciation.

== See also ==
- Sturtian glaciation
- Adelaide Superbasin
- Huronian glaciation
