= Kaigas =

Hypothesized snowball earth event

Events of the Tonian Period

←	First sponge-like animal?

←	Beginning of Sturtian glaciation

←	Sharp drop in Stromatolite Population

←	End of Boring Billion

Events of the Tonian Period.
Vertical axis scale: Millions of years ago

The Kaigas glaciation was a hypothesized Snowball Earth event in the Neoproterozoic Era, preceding the Sturtian glaciation. Its occurrence was inferred based on the interpretation of Kaigas Formation conglomerates in the stratigraphy overlying the Kalahari Craton as correlative with pre-Sturtian Numees formation glacial diamictites. However, the Kaigas formation was later determined to be non-glacial, and a Sturtian age was assigned to the Numees diamictites. Thus, there is no longer any evidence for a Neoproterozoic glaciation prior to the Sturtian Snowball Earth event.
