= Huronian glaciation =

Severe glaciation during the Paleoproterozoic era

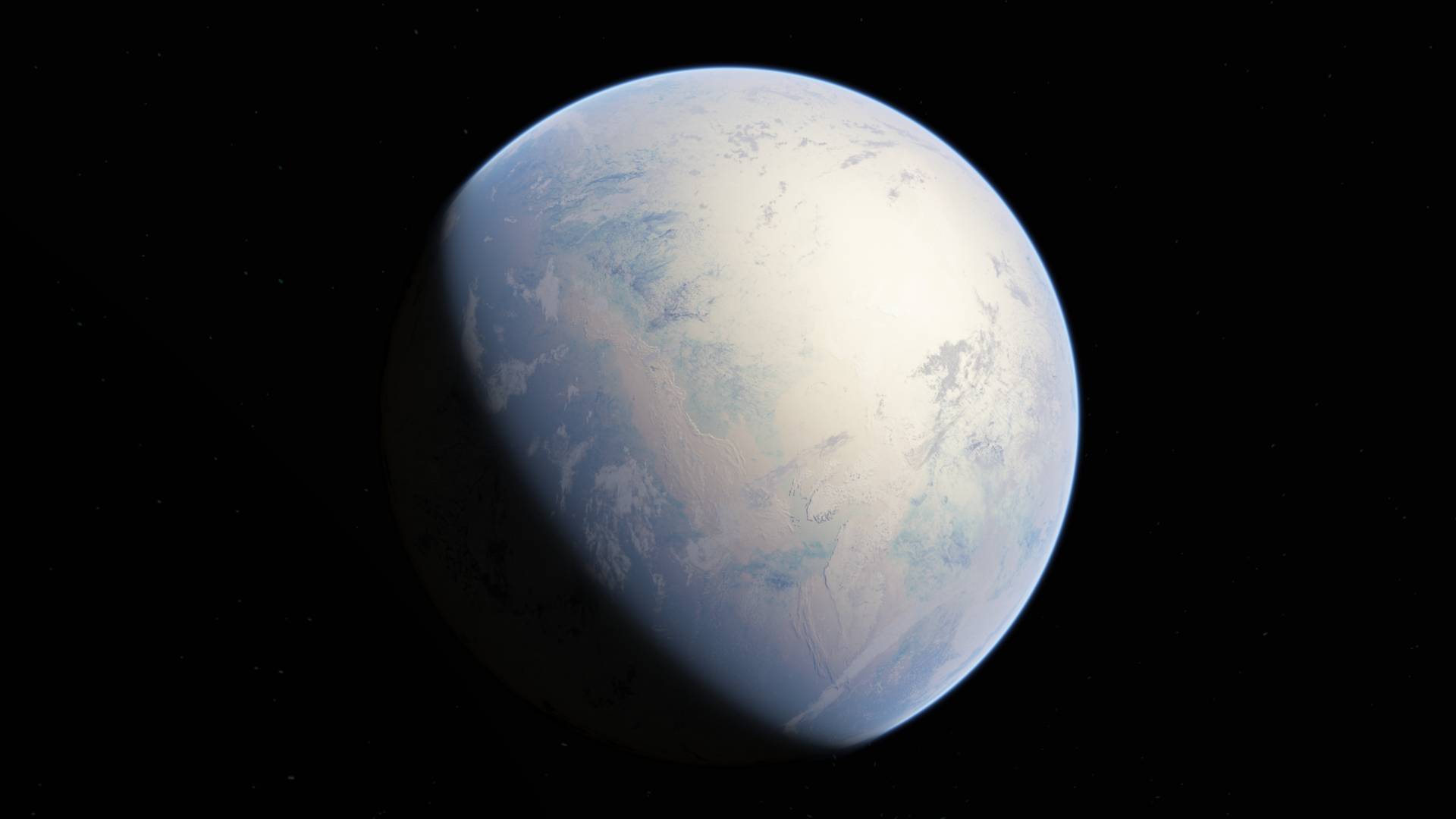
Artist's impression of the "snowball Earth" interpretation of the Huronian glaciation, with ice covering the whole planet.

The Huronian glaciation (or Makganyene glaciation) refers to a series of three ancient glacial periods approximately 2.4 to 2.1 billion years ago, during the Siderian and Rhyacian periods of the Paleoproterozoic era. It is named after the Huronian Supergroup, one of several widespread stratigraphic sequences with similar ages containing diamictites, rocks interpreted as evidence of glaciation. The Huronian glaciation broadly coincides with the Great Oxidation Event, with changes in atmospheric composition and a loss of greenhouse gases likely contributing to the cooler global climate. The Huronian glaciation is one of the earliest glaciations known, only the Pongola glaciation predates it.

== Discovery and name ==
In 1907, Arthur Coleman first inferred a "lower Huronian ice age" from analysis of a geological formation near Lake Huron in Ontario. In his honour, the lower (glacial) member of the Gowganda Formation is referred to as the Coleman member. These rocks have been studied in detail by numerous geologists and are considered to represent the type example of a Paleoproterozoic glaciation.

The ice age is also known as the Makganyene glaciation, named after the Makganyene Formation in South Africa which exhibits some similarities in lithostratigraphy, most notably in the deposition of numerous diamictites comparable in age.

The confusion of the terms glaciation and ice age has led to the more recent impression that the entire time period represents a single glacial event with continuous ice coverage. The term "Huronian" was used to describe a lithostratigraphic supergroup and according to The North American Stratigraphic Code should not be used to describe glacial cycles. Diachronic or geochronometric units should be used according to the code.

== Geological context ==
The three glacial diamictite-bearing units of the Huronian Supergroup are, from the oldest to youngest, the Ramsay Lake, Bruce, and Gowganda formations. The rocks span the region north of Lake Huron, between Sault Ste. Marie, Ontario, and Rouyn-Noranda, Quebec. The Gowganda Formation in particular contains "the most widespread and most convincing glaciogenic deposits of this era", according to Eyles and Young. In North America, similar-age deposits are exposed in Michigan, the Medicine Bow Mountains, Wyoming, Chibougamau, Quebec, and central Nunavut. Globally, glacial deposits of a roughly comparable age occur in the Makganyene Formation of the Griquatown Basin in South Africa, as well as India and Australia.

Due to the global distribution of these deposits, it was theorized that one or more of the glaciations may have been snowball Earth events, when all or most of Earth's surface was covered in ice. This theory went on to shape public perception of the period in mainstream press, but determining the original location and exact ages of rocks this old is extremely difficult and the theory remains controversial. The palaeomagnetic evidence which could suggest ice sheets were present at low latitudes is contested, and the glacial sediments (diamictites) are discontinuous, alternating with carbonate and other sedimentary rocks indicating temperate climates, providing scant evidence for global glaciation.

== Relationship to the Great Oxidation Event ==
Before the Huronian glaciation and the Great Oxidation Event, most organisms were anaerobic microbes, relying on chemosynthesis and retinal-based anoxygenic photosynthesis for production of biological energy and biocompounds. This changed once cyanobacteria evolved porphyrin-based oxygenic photosynthesis, which produced dioxygen as a waste product. At first, most of this oxygen was dissolved in the ocean and absorbed through the oxidation of reduced surface ferrous compounds, atmospheric methane and hydrogen sulfide. Eventually though, these sinks were saturated and free oxygen accumulated in the atmosphere, leading to a permanent change in the atmospheric chemistry of the Earth.

This atmospheric shift led to changes in the Earth's energy balance. Now-abundant oxygen reacted with methane to form carbon dioxide and water, both much weaker greenhouse gases, greatly reducing the potency of the greenhouse effect, especially as water vapor readily precipitated out of the air with dropping temperature. This caused an icehouse state, compounded by the lower solar irradiation at the time as well as potentially reduced geothermal activity. Extensive ice coverage led to the deposition of glacial rocks in multiple sequences across the globe, including what would become the Huronian Supergroup. The combination of increasing free oxygen (which causes oxidative damage to organic compounds) and climate change may have caused an extinction event, which would have wiped out most of the anaerobe-dominated microbial mats both on the Earth's surface and in shallow seas.

== See also ==
- Timeline of glaciation
- Great Oxidation Event
- Snowball Earth
