= Shiwangzhuang Formation =

Geologic formation in China

- Stratigraphic range: 910–720 Ma
- Type: Formation
- Unit of: Tumen Group
- Underlies: Fulaishan Formation
- Overlies: Wushan Formation

Location
- Country: China

The Shiwangzhuang Formation is a geologic formation in China. It preserves eukaryotic fossils dating back to the Tonian period, around 900-800 Ma.

== Paleobiota ==
After Li et al, 2020, Han et al, 2021 and others.

Color key: Taxon / Reclassified taxon / Taxon falsely reported as present / Dubious taxon or junior synonym / Ichnotaxon / Ootaxon / Morphotaxon	Notes; Uncertain or tentative taxa are in small text; ~~crossed out~~ taxa are discredited.

Paleobiota
Genus	Species	Notes	Images
Anqiutrichoides	A. constrictus	Filamentous fossil, bears similarities to Eosolenides and Protoarenicola.	
Eosolena	E. magna	Filamentous fossil, member of Eosolenides	Line drawing of Eosolena loculosa
Protoarenicola	P. baiguashanensis; P. baishicunensis; P. shijiacunensis	Annulated algal fossil, member of the Huainan biota.	
Pararenicola	P. huaiyanensis; P. gejiazhuangensis	Annulated algal fossil, member of the Huainan biota.	Line drawing of Pararenicola huaiyuanensis
Sinosabellidites	S. huainanensis; S. huangshanensis	Annulated algal fossil, member of the Huainan biota.	
Longfengshania	L. sp	Frondose alga, sometimes synonymised with Tawuia.	Longfengshania from the Ancanping assemblage of the Doushantuo Formation
Arctacellularia	A. tetragonala	Microscopic algae	
Tawuia	T. dalensis	Enigmatic eukaryote	A reconstruction of Tawuia as a coenocytic macroalgae with epibionts.
Horodyskia	H. moniliformis; H. minor	Enigmatic eukaryote	
Chuaria	C. circularis	Enigmatic eukaryote	Specimen from China
Vendotaenia	V. sp	Vendotaenid: enigmatic eukaryote?	
?Jacutianema	?J. sp	Enigmatic eukaryote, assignment to genus dubious	
Glomulus	G. filamentum	Cyanobacteria	Line drawing of Glomulus filamentum
Mucoplagum	M. primitivum	Cyanobacteria	Line drawing of Mucoplagum primitivum
Siphonophycus	S. punctatum; S. kestron; S. solidum; S. typicum	Cyanobacteria	Line drawing reconstruction of Siphonophycus attenuatum
Navifusa	N. actinomorpha; N. majensis	Cyanobacteria	
Leiosphaeridia	L. jacutica; L. tenuissima	Acritarch	
Simia	S. annulare	Acritarch	
Ostiana	O. microcystis	Colonial acritarch	
Synsphaeridium	S. sp	Colonial acritarch	
Polysphaeroides	P. filiformis	Filamentous acritarch	
Pellicularia	P. tenera	Filamentous acritarch	
Polythrichoides	P. lineatus	Filamentous acritarch	
