= James Willard Schultz =

American historian (1859–1947)

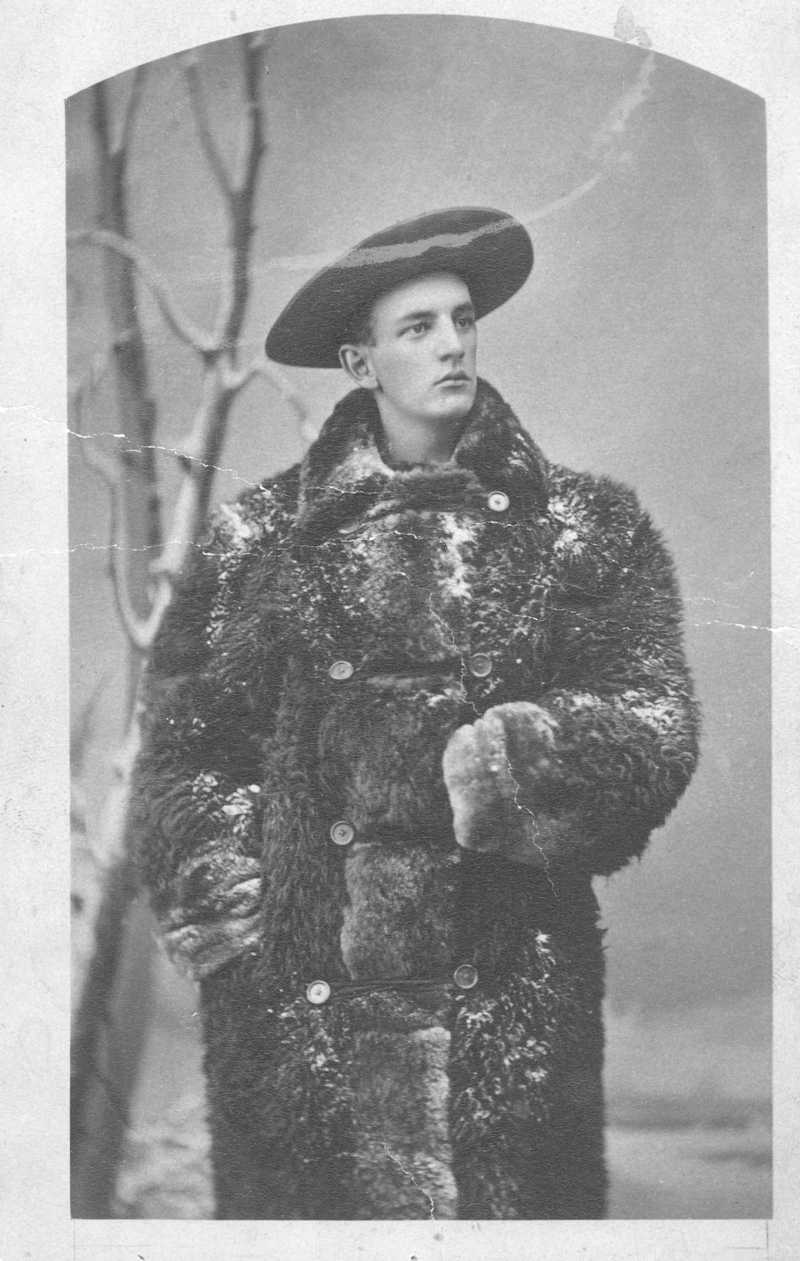
- James Willard Schultz, age 30
- Born: August 26, 1859; Boonville, New York
- Died: June 11, 1947 (aged 87); Wind River Reservation, Wyoming
- Resting place: Blackfeet Indian Reservation, Montana; 48°39′31″N 112°52′18″W
- Other names: Apikuni, Appekunny

James Willard Schultz, or Apikuni, (August 26, 1859 – June 11, 1947) was an American writer, explorer, Glacier National Park guide, fur trader and historian of the Blackfeet Indians. He operated a fur trading post at Carroll, Montana 47°34′25″N 108°22′24″W and lived among the Pikuni tribe during the period 1880–82. He was given the name Apikuni by the Pikuni chief, Running Crane. Apikuni in Blackfeet means "Spotted Robe." Schultz is most noted for his 37 books, most about Blackfoot life, and for his contributions to the naming of prominent features in Glacier National Park.

== Early life ==
Schultz was born August 26, 1859, in Boonville, New York 43°29′01″N 075°20′12″W to well-to-do parents, Frances and Philander Bushrod Schults [as they spelled it]. The house where he was born is marked with a plaque as a New York State Historic Landmark. Young James enjoyed the outdoors and his father ensured he was mentored by experienced outdoorsmen and hunters in the Adirondacks during camping and hunting trips. He became an experienced shooter at an early age.

== Early years in Montana ==
As a young adult, Schultz moved to Fort Conrad, Montana, on the Marias River. He worked at various trading posts as a clerk for fur trader James Kipp, and he established a trading post at Fort Conrad in 1880. During that time he traded with the Pikuni and the Bloods and established another trading post at Carroll, Montana, on the Missouri River, where he also traded with the Cree.

== Glacier National Park ==
In the mid-1880s, Schultz began to spend more time in the Two Medicine and Saint Mary Lakes region of what is now Glacier National Park guiding and outfitting local hunters. In late 1884 he sent an article entitled "To Chief Mountain" to Forest and Stream, one of his first literary efforts. The article was published in 1885. At the time George Bird Grinnell was the magazine's editor, and he became intrigued with Schultz and the Glacier region. Grinnell solicited Schultz to outfit and guide him on a hunting trip in Glacier in September 1885. Although the trip was not a great success for Grinnell, he did kill a Bighorn ram on a mountain near the Upper Saint Mary Lake with a single shot.

Schultz promptly named the mountain Singleshot Mountain to honor Grinnell's feat. Thus began decades of Schultz naming features in the Glacier regions for clients and friends, and to honor traditional Indian names. Montana State University Library has a digital library of papers and photographs documenting Schultz's time in Montana and Glacier National Park, as well as the physical materials that are part of James Willard Schultz's collection, which are held at the Montana State University's Archives and Special Collections.

=== Glacier features named by Schultz ===
- Divide Mountain
- Flattop Mountain - 48°44′22″N 113°31′16″W: 8,356 feet (2,547 m)
- Grinnell Glacier was named by Lt. John H. Beacom of the USGS in 1887. This fact is verifiable in both journals kept by George Bird Grinnell and John H. Beacom. Schultz was in the group that first heard the name.
- Grinnell Mountain was also named by Lt. John H. Beacom in 1887.
- Grinnell Lake Schultz was among a small group of men who named Grinnell Lake in 1887 or 1889.
- Going-to-the-Sun Mountain - 48°41′27″N 113°38′11″W: 9,642 feet (2,939 m)
- Singleshot Mountain
- White Fish Mountain, originally named Yellow Fish Mountain by Schultz

=== Glacier features named for Schultz ===
- Apikuni Creek - 48°48′18″N 113°37′06″W, el. 4,793 feet (1,461 m)
- Apikuni Flat - 48°48′05″N 113°38′03″W, el. 4,869 feet (1,484 m)
- Apikuni Falls - 48°48′51″N 113°38′33″W, el. 5,522 feet (1,683 m)
- Apikuni Mountain - 48°50′11″N 113°39′14″W, el. 8,989 feet (2,740 m)

== Arizona ==
Schultz first visited Arizona in 1906–07, during which time he assisted J. Walter Fewkes in the excavation and restoration of the pueblo ruins at Casa Grande. Due to his success as a writer and explorer, in 1913 he became the first non-resident to build a cabin in the remote White Mountains, near Greer, Arizona. He would use the cabin as a seasonal retreat for decades.

== Author ==
James Willard Schultz started writing at the age of 21, publishing articles and stories in Forest and Stream for 15 years. He did not write his first book until 1907 at age 48. The memoir My Life as an Indian tells the story of his first year living with the Pikuni tribe of Blackfeet Indians east of Glacier. In 1911, he associated himself with publishers Houghton Mifflin; the firm published Schultz's subsequent books for the next 30 years. In 1918 he authored Bird Woman, a novel about Sacajawea. His son, Lone Wolf, provided the illustrations for the novel, and Schultz dedicated the book to him: "Born near the close of the buffalo days he was, and ever since with his baby hands he began to model statuettes of horses and buffalo and deer with clay from the river banks, his one object has been the world of art."

In all, Schultz wrote and published 37 fiction and non-fiction books dealing with the Blackfeet, Kootenai, and Flathead Indians. His works received critical literary acclaim from the general media as well as academia for his story telling and contributions to ethnology. Sometime after 1902, while living in Southern California, Schultz worked for a while as the literary editor of the Los Angeles Times.

== Family ==
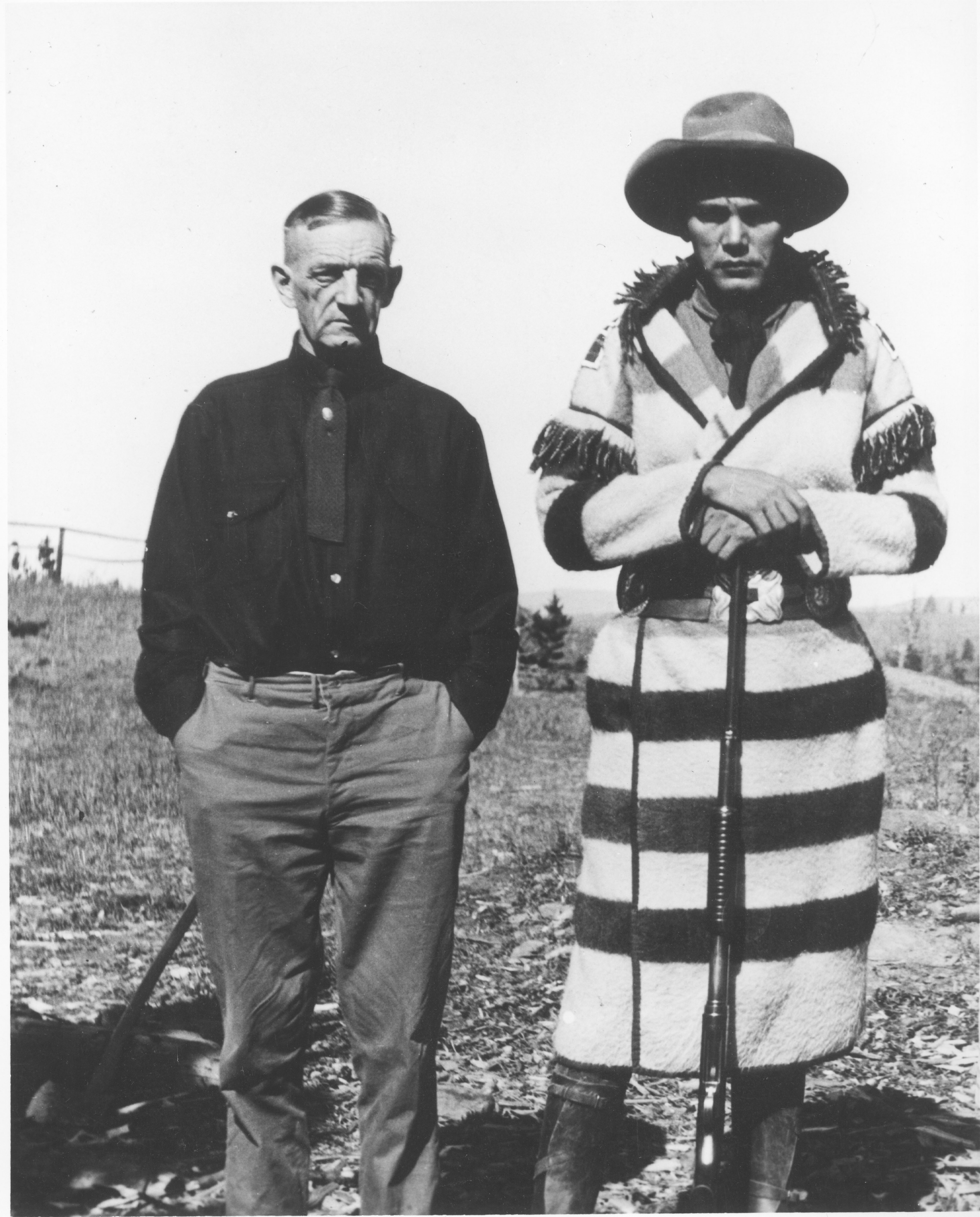
Schultz and his son Lone Wolf, 1920

Schultz's first marriage in 1879 was to Natahki (meaning 'Fine Shield Woman'), a Piegan Blackfeet. Natahki was a survivor of the Baker massacre in 1870. They had a son named Hart Merriam Schultz, or Lone Wolf (1882–1970). He was named after Schultz's boyhood friend Clinton Hart Merriam. Natahki died in 1903.

In 1907 while Schultz was living in Los Angeles as the literary editor for the Los Angeles Times, he married Celia Hawkins of Highland Park, IL (b. 1865, d. 1960) . It is believed that she went to Los Angeles in response to his advertisement for a wife. Some time thereafter, they resumed his life with the Indians. They lived in Butterfly Lodge in Greer, occupying the cabin starting in 1914 . The dedication of his book With the Indians in the Rockies (published in 1912) reads: "This book is affectionately dedicated to my wife Celia Hawkins Schultz whose good comradeship and sympathy have been my greatest help in writing this tale". The Blackfoot gave her the name "No-Coward Woman" after she had an encounter with a grizzly bear.

She lived with Schultz from their marriage in 1907 until she left him in 1928. This period marks the time of his most extensive literary output as he wrote the majority of his books during this time. Their divorce was made final in 1930, and in 1932 a settlement was finalized in which she received half of the royalties from his works published before 1930. Celia Hawkins Schultz died in 1960 in Highland Park, IL, one month shy of her 95th birthday.

Schultz married again, to Jessica 'Jessie' Schultz. (Jessica Louise Donaldson had been a teacher in a one-room schoolhouse in Grayling, Montana, and later earned an MA in anthropology from the University of CA. In 1926–7, as a professor of English at Montana State College, now Montana State University-Bozeman, she helped write and produce a play/pageant entitled 'The Masque of the Absaroka'. It focused on Absaroka (Crow) culture, featuring numerous Native Americans from the Crow Nation. She was a lifelong advocate for Northern Plains Indian culture, and particularly for the welfare of women, assisting with the development of markets for the sale of bead and leather goods.) Jessie made arrangements to publish some of Schultz's works posthumously, such as Bear Chief's War Shirt. She married again after his death, to Henry Graham.

== Death ==
James Schultz suffered from ill health for most of his last 30 years. Guiding in the rugged Glacier area took its toll physically. He suffered from incapacitating lung and heart infections. In 1931 he injured his spine. In 1942 he fell, breaking his left leg and right arm. In September 1944, a fall at his home in Denver broke his hip and required major surgery to repair. His deteriorating health severely reduced his ability to write and concentrate. After moving to the Wind River Reservation in Wyoming to be close to the Native American tribes he grew up with, he suffered a fatal heart attack and died on June 11, 1947. He wanted to be buried in Montana and was laid to rest on the Blackfeet Reservation 48°39′31″N 112°52′18″W near Browning, Montana, in the old burial ground of the family of Natahki, his first wife.

== List of works ==
=== Books by Schultz ===
- Schultz, James Willard (1907). My Life as an Indian-The Story of a Red Woman and a White Man in the Lodges of the Blackfeet (PDF). New York: Doubleday, Page & Company.
- Schultz, James Willard (1912). With the Indians in the Rockies. Boston, MA: Houghton Mifflin Company.
- Schultz, James Willard (1913). Sinopah: The Indian Boy. Boston, MA: Houghton Mifflin Company.
- Schultz, James Willard (1913). The Quest of the Fish-dog Skin. Boston, MA: Houghton Mifflin Company.
- Schultz, James Willard (1914). On The Warpath (PDF). Boston, MA: Houghton Mifflin Company.
- Schultz, James Willard (1916). Blackfeet Tales of Glacier National Park. Boston: Houghton, Mifflin & Co.
- Schultz, James Willard (1916). Apauk-Caller of Buffalo (PDF). Boston: Houghton, Mifflin & Co.
- Schultz, James Willard (1917). The Gold Cache. Boston: Houghton, Mifflin & Co.
- Schultz, James Willard (1918). Bird Woman (Sacajewa) - The Guide of Lewis and Clark. Boston: Houghton, Mifflin & Co.
- Schultz, James Willard (1918). Lone Bull's Mistake-A Lodgepole Chief Story. Boston: Houghton, Mifflin & Co.
- Schultz, James Willard (1919). Rising Wolf-The White Blackfeet, Hugh Monroe's Story of his first year on the plains (PDF). Boston, MA: Houghton Mifflin Company.
- Schultz, James Willard (1919). Running Eagle-The Warrior Girl. Boston, MA: Houghton Mifflin Company.
- Schultz, James Willard (1920). In the Great Apache Forest. Boston, MA: Houghton Mifflin Company.
- Schultz, James Willard (1920). Dreadful River Cave. Boston, MA: Houghton Mifflin Company.
- Schultz, James Willard (1921). The War-Trail Fort-Further Adventures of Thomas Fox and Pitamakan (PDF). Boston, MA: Houghton Mifflin Company.
- Schultz, James Willard (1921). Seizer of Eagles. Boston: Houghton, Mifflin & Co.
- Schultz, James Willard (1922). Trail of the Spanish Horse. Boston: Houghton, Mifflin & Co.
- Schultz, James Willard (1923). The Danger Trail: A Thrilling Story of the Fur-Traders. Boston: Houghton, Mifflin & Co.
- Schultz, James Willard (1923). Friends of My Life as an Indian. Boston: Houghton, Mifflin & Co.
- Schultz, James Willard (1924). Sahtaki And I. Boston: Houghton, Mifflin & Co.
- Schultz, James Willard (1924). Plumed Snake Medicine. Boston: Houghton, Mifflin & Co.
- Schultz, James Willard (1925). Questers of the Desert. Boston: Houghton, Mifflin & Co.
- Schultz, James Willard (1926). Signposts of Adventure:Glacier National Park as the Indians Know It. Boston: Houghton, Mifflin & Co.
- Schultz, James Willard (1926). Sun Woman - A Novel. Boston: Houghton, Mifflin & Co.
- Schultz, James Willard (1926). William Jackson-Indian Scout. Boston: Houghton, Mifflin & Co.
- Schultz, James Willard (1927). A Son of the Navahos. Boston: Houghton, Mifflin & Co.
- Schultz, James Willard (1927). Red Crow's Brother. Boston: Houghton, Mifflin & Co.
- Schultz, James Willard (1928). In Enemy Country. Boston: Houghton, Mifflin & Co.
- Schultz, James Willard (1929). Skull Head The Terrible. Boston: Houghton, Mifflin & Co.
- Schultz, James Willard (1930). The White Beaver. Boston: Houghton, Mifflin & Co.
- Schultz, James Willard; Donaldson, Jesse Louise (1930). Sun God's Children. Boston: Houghton, Mifflin & Co.
- Schultz, James Willard (1931). Friends and Foes in the Rockies. Boston: Houghton, Mifflin & Co.
- Schultz, James Willard (1933). Alder Gulch Gold. Boston: Houghton, Mifflin & Co.
- Schultz, James Willard (1934). Gold Dust. Boston: Houghton, Mifflin & Co.
- Schultz, James Willard (1936). The White Buffalo Robe. Boston: Houghton, Mifflin & Co.
- Schultz, James Willard (1937). Stained Gold. Boston: Houghton, Mifflin & Co.
- Schultz, James Willard (1940). Short Bow's Big Medicine. Boston: Houghton, Mifflin & Co.
- Schultz, James Willard (1961). Blackfeet Man: Stories of the Famous Montana Indian Story Writer and an Original Map and Guide to the Beautiful Region He Loved (Montana Heritage Series). Helena, MT: Montana Historical Society. (published posthumously)
- Schultz, James Willard (1962). Blackfeet and Buffalo: Memories of My Life among the Indians. Norman: University of Oklahoma Press. (published posthumously)
