= Frederick Weygold =

American painter

- Born: June 13, 1870; St. Charles, Missouri, U.S.
- Died: August 13, 1941 (aged 71); Louisville, Kentucky, U.S.
- Known for: Photography; Painting

Frederick Weygold (June 13, 1870 in Saint Charles, Missouri – August 13, 1941 in Louisville, Kentucky) was an American painter, photographer and ethnographer, who has researched the life and culture of the North American Indians mainly examples of various Sioux tribes and artistically presented as scientific.

== Life and creative work ==
He was learning art and languages in Germany before he moved in Louisville in 1908. In Europe Weygold became interested in American Indians, learning the Lakota language and Native American culture. This experience was of great help to him later to advise to European museum directors.

In 1909, Weygold went to the Pine Ridge and Rosebud Reservations in South Dakota, where he obtained Native American artifacts for the Museum of Ethnology in Hamburg. He also made a lot of photographs to reflect Native American life and culture. In his photographs he also reserved the first evidence of the Plains Indian sign language. Later he was able to use his ethnographic experience to illustrate two books by the Dakota author Charles Eastman and two others by James Willard Schultz for a German publisher. Weygold gathered a personal collection of Native American artifacts and he later presented it to the Speed Art Museum, which now approves to be the main part of the museum's collection.

During a long period, Native American artifacts were far more popular in Europe — where Weygold did much of his work — than in the United States.

== Books ==
- Frederick Weygold: Das indianische Lederzelt im Königlischen Museum für Völkerkunde zu Berlin, Verlag Vieweg, Braunschweig 1903
- Frederick Weygold: Die Hunkazeremonie, Verlag Vieweg, Braunschweig 1912
- Frederick Weygold: Oil Paintings Illustrating Indian Life, as he saw it, in 1909-1937, The J. B. Speed Memorial Museum, Louisville 1938
- Frederick Weygold: The Indian sign language: and, The winter count of Lone Dog, The J. B. Speed Memorial Museum, Louisville 1939
- Frederick Weygold: The Indian Collection, The J. B. Speed Memorial Museum, Louisville 1940

== Books about him ==
- J. W. Schultz: Natahkí und ich. Mein Leben unter Schwarzfußindianern, Illustrations by Frederick Weygold, Ernte-Verlag, Hamburg 1922
- J. W. Schultz: In Natahkís Zelt. Mein Leben als Indianer, Illustrations by Frederick Weygold, Ernte-Verlag, Hamburg 1925
- Wolfgang Haberland: Die Oglala-Sammlung Weygold im Hamburgischen Museum für Völkerkunde, Teil 1-9; Schriftenreihe: Mitteilungen aus dem Museum für Völkerkunde Hamburg, Bände 3-4, 6-8, 10-12, 14; Hamburg 1973-1984
- Wolfgang Haberland, Frederick Weygold: Ich, Dakota – Pine Ridge Reservation 1909, Verlag Dietrich Reimer, Berlin 1986
- Charles A. Eastman: Ohijésa. Jugenderinnerungen eines Sioux-Indianers, Illustrations by Frederick Weygold, Agentur des Rauhen Hauses, Hamburg 1912 (Reprinted: Insel Verlag, Frankfurt am Main 1976)
- Charles A. Eastman: Winona. Indianergeschichten aus alter Zeit, Agentur des Rauhen Hauss, Hamburg 1920 (Reprinted: Insel Verlag, Frankfurt am Main 1996)
- Stanley Vestal: Happy Hunting Grounds, Illustrations by Frederick Weygold, Lyons and Carnahan, Chicago 1928 (Reprinted: University of Oklahoma Press, Norman 1975)
- Christian Feest and C. Ronald Corum: Frederick Weyold. Artist and Ethographer of North American Indians, ZKF Publishers, Altenstadt 2017
- Frederick Weygold: Artist and Ethnographer of North American Indians by Christian F. Feest (Editor), C. Ronald Corum (Editor). Publisher: ZKF Publishers (January 17, 2017). ISBN 978-3981841206
