= Huainan biota =

Collection of macroscopic organisms

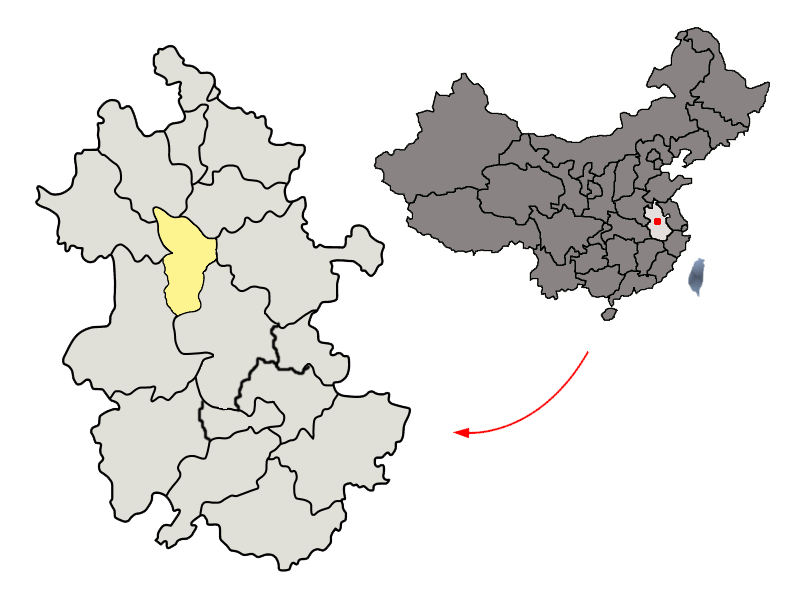
Location of Huainan City, Anhui Province, China

The Huainan biota is a collection of macroscopic organisms discovered in the early 1980s in the Precambrian deposits of China (Huainan City, Anhui Province), that represent a transitional period in evolution. Research on the fossils continues to reveal new and significant information.

== Discovery and age ==
Huainan biota organisms were discovered by Wang Guixiang and Sun Weiguo in the 1980s in Precambrian rock formations near Huainan City. The organisms date back to 840-740 million years ago (Ma). This falls into the Tonian period, which marks a transitional phase in Earth's history where life began evolving from tiny micro-organisms to larger organisms.

== Geologic setting ==
In the Huainan area, the Neoproterozoic rock layers are classified in three main groups; the Huainan Group, Feishui Group, and the Fengtai Formation. They each represent a different sedimentary cycle. The Huainan group is made up of siliciclastic rocks like sandstone and shale. The Feishui group consists of carbonate rocks, such as limestone and dolomite, and includes fossil-bearing formations, such as the Jiuliqiao Formation, where the Huainan Biota was found. The Fengtai Formation is composed of glacial deposits of diamictites.

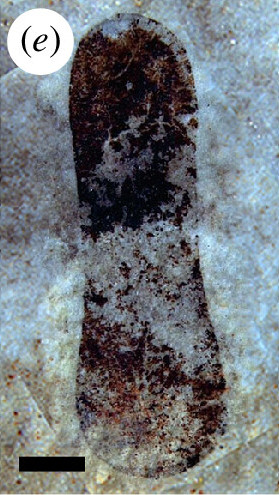
A Tonian-age organism visually similar to Huainan biota fossils: Tawuia dalensis from the Shiwangzhuang Formation

== Fossil description ==
Two types of Huainan biota were found in the Jiuliqiao Formation, a geological rock unit ranging from 26 to 119 meters thick, dating to the Ediacaran Period. Their difference being in their fossil shapes. The first type of biota consists of a worm-like, tubular structure. The second type of biota consists of solitary discs with a central opening. Both fossil types vary between 0.5-2 mm in size.

== Similar biota ==
A similar biota, about 1 billion years old, was found by M. B. Gnilovskaya in Russia on the Timan Ridge. It is only known that its constituent organisms (Protoarenicola, Pararenicola, Sinosabellidites) reached several centimeters in size (which is significantly inferior to the Ediacaran ones) and, apparently, had the shape of segmented tubes, often goblet-shaped, with extensions at the end. Huainan biota do not contain jellyfish-like "discs" (as seen in the Ediacaran biota), nor any forms close to sponges.

== See also ==
- Otavia
- Precambrian
- Ediacaran

== Further literature ==
- Sun Weiguo, Wang Guixiang, Zhou Benhe. Macroscopic worm-like body fossils from the Upper Precambrian (900—700 Ma), Huainan district, Anhui, China and their stratigraphic and evolutionary significance // Precambrian Research. — 1986. — Vol. 31, No. 4. — P. 377–403. — doi:10.1016/0301-9268(86)90041-0.
- Leiming Yin, Weiguo Sun. Microbiota from the Neoproterozoic Liulaobei Formation in the Huainan region, northern Anhui, China. // Precambrian Research. - Volume 65, Issues 1–4, January 1994, Pages 95–114.
