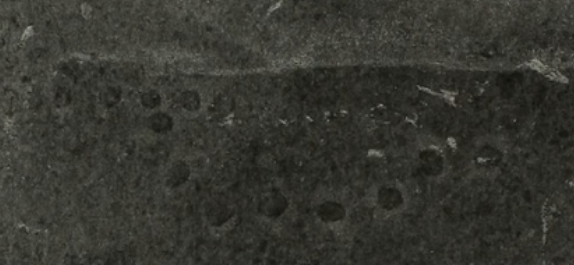
- The holotype fossil of Horodyskia moniliformis

Scientific classification
- Domain: Eukaryota
- (unranked): incertae sedis
- Genus: †Horodyskia; Yochelson & Fedonkin, 2000

Type species
- †Horodyskia moniliformis Yochelson & Fedonkin, 2000

Species
- H. moniliformis Yochelson & Fedonkin, 2000; H. minor Dong, Xiao, Shen & Zhou, 2008

Synonyms
- Horodyskia: Longbizuiella Yi et al., 2022; Parahorodyskia Liu and Dong in Liu et al., 2022; H. moniliformis: Horodyskia williamsi Grey et al., 2010; H. minor: Longbizuiella hunanensis Yi et al., 2022; Parahorodyskia disjuncta Liu and Dong in Liu et al., 2022

= Horodyskia =

Horodyskia Temporal range: Middle Calymmian – Late Ediacaran ~1480–550 Ma

Fossilised organism

Horodyskia is a fossilised organism found in rocks dated from 1,480 million years ago to 550 million years ago. Its shape has been described as a "string of beads" connected by a very fine thread. It is considered one of the oldest known eukaryotes.

== Discovery and naming ==
The holotype material for Horodyskia was found in the Appekunny Formation, Glacier National Park in Montana in 1982, and was formally described and named in 2000.

The genus is named after American paleontologist Robert J. Horodyski, in honor of his contributions to Precambrian paleontology.

== Description ==
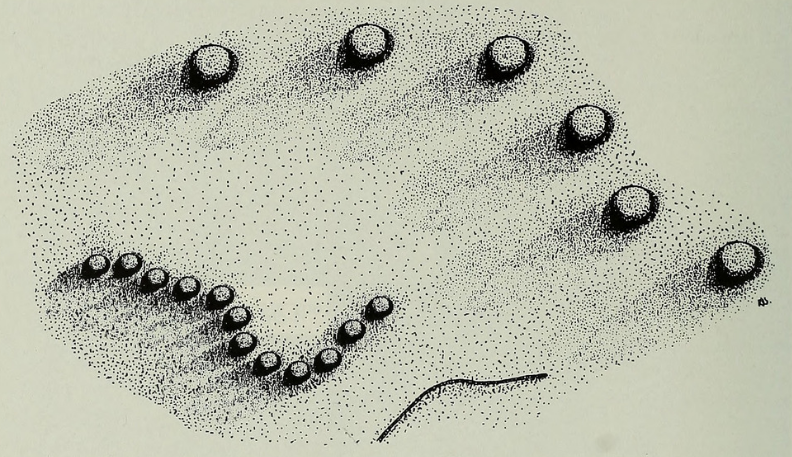
Original artist reconstruction of Horodyskia moniliformis. Note the current crescents forming 'shadows' behind each body, and the undeveloped stolon.

Horodyskia is an organism that consists of a series of spherical bead-like structures, sometimes growing from a stolon. The diameter of the bodies and the spaces between each one is almost coequal, and the number of bodies within a given series decreases when they grow further upwards and out, but remaining a similar shape and distance from each other throughout this growth. The bodies themselves may have been fairly resistant in life, inferred by coarser sediments being deposited in the depressions around the bodies as well as current crescents forming, and also whole bodies being removed from the stolon, leaving only a depression.

It is also noted to have halos, previously interpreted as the bodies themselves decaying, now as a gelatinous material surrounding them. This material is a lot less resistant that the bodies, with either the bodies themselves moving around within the halos, or the material being entirely stripped off the bodies.

== Biology ==
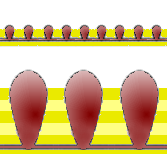
Horodyskia apparently re-arranged itself into fewer but larger main masses as the sediment grew deeper round its base.

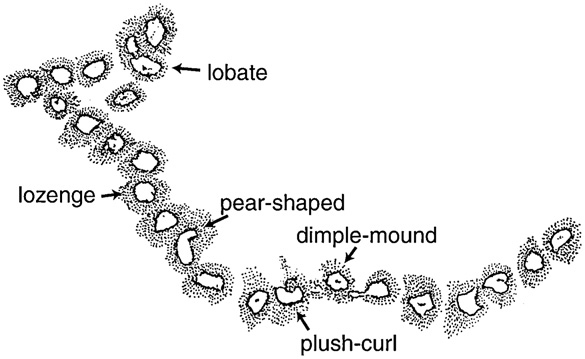
The bead structures of Horodyskia vary in shape.

Comparisons of different fossils in the same locations suggest that it rearranged itself into fewer but larger main masses as the sediment grew deeper round its base. It may also have had a series of holdfasts along the bottom of the thread. Dimple marks in offshore sandstone have been found in the same deposits as Horodyskia, suggesting that they may be remnants of older holdfasts. Thin sections of Horodyskia have revealed a system of tubes within the beads, including connecting strings, and other tubes radiating outward from each bead. Partial burial and branching of these tubes suggest that it may have had a benthic sessile lifestyle. Members of the genus are distinguished by bead size and spacing, with the beads of H. moniliformis being larger and more spaced out than H. minor.

Multiple specimens of Horodyskia found across the world also bear a noticeable halo around each bead, which has been postured to be a result of an abiotic process, either from current activity or the degradation of organic matter. Multiple studies also favour a biotic origin, with a recent 2023 study done on specimens of H. moniliformis found within the Shiwangzhuang Formation suggesting that the halos were the faint remains of a gelatinous matrix that surrounded the beads in life. This substance was not stable, as some beads are not at the centre of these halos, or the halos themselves aren't present, mostly likely due to the gelatinous halo being moved or ripped off post-mortem by water currents. It has also been noted that these specimens from the Shiwangzhuang Formation do not have stolons, either due to a preservation bias, or the fact that it was the gelatinous halo that held the beads together.

== Distribution ==
Species of Horodyskia has been found in Western Australia, Southern China, and in parts of North America, They are found in siliciclastic rocks such as sandstone, often as casts or molds.

== Classification ==
Like many Precambrian organisms, the biology of Horodyskia is still poorly understood. As a result, it is difficult to classify what type of organism it may have been. Horodyskia has been considered an early metazoan, and a colonial foraminiferan. More recently it has been hypothesized that they are a type of Geosiphon-like fungus (Glomeromycota, Archaeosporales), due to the similarity of Horodyskia’s bead-like structures to the bladders of early growth stage Geosiphons. Horodyskia is almost certainly a eukaryote due to its large size and inferred cell wall, although likely a quite simple protist since its “beads” are quite cell-like in appearance. Its exact placement is unclear, as although a giant-celled alga is the best match, modern examples of these do not form lines of cells in a gelatinous matrix, alongside having rhizoids unlike Horodyskia.

== See also ==
- List of Ediacaran genera
- Francevillian biota
  - Francevillian B Formation
