= Neoproterozoic =

Third and last era of the Proterozoic Eon

- 1000 – 538.8 ± 0.6 Ma
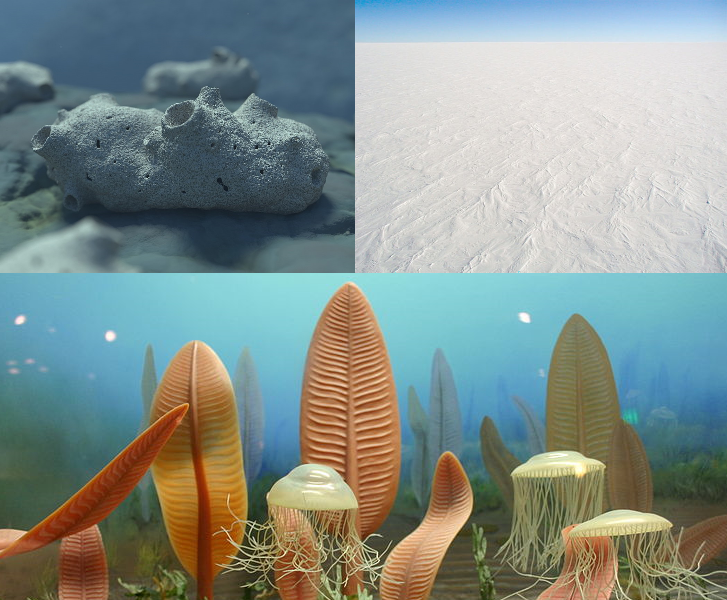
- Clockwise, from top left: Otavia, a multicellular organism from Tonian period, Snowball Earth glaciations from Cryogenian period, Ediacaran biota from Ediacaran period

Chronology
An approximate timescale of key Neoproterozoic events Vertical axis scale: Millions of years ago
- Proposed redefinition(s): 850–541 Ma; Gradstein et al., 2012
- Proposed subdivisions: Cryogenian Period, 850–630 Ma Gradstein et al., 2012; Ediacaran Period, 630–541.0 Ma Gradstein et al., 2012

Etymology
- Name formality: Formal

Usage information
- Celestial body: Earth
- Regional usage: Global (ICS)
- Time scale(s) used: ICS Time Scale

Definition
- Chronological unit: Era
- Stratigraphic unit: Erathem
- Time span formality: Formal
- Lower boundary definition: Defined Chronometrically
- Lower GSSA ratified: 1990
- Upper boundary definition: Appearance of the Ichnofossil Treptichnus pedum
- Upper boundary GSSP: Fortune Head section, Newfoundland, Canada; 47.0762°N 55.8310°W
- Upper GSSP ratified: August 1992 (as base of Cambrian)

The Neoproterozoic is the last of the three geologic eras of the Proterozoic eon, spanning from 1 billion to 538.8 million years ago, and is the last era of the Precambrian "supereon". It is preceded by the Mesoproterozoic era and succeeded by the Paleozoic era of the Phanerozoic eon, and is further subdivided into three periods, the Tonian, Cryogenian and Ediacaran.

One of the most severe glaciation events known in the geologic record occurred during the Cryogenian period of the Neoproterozoic, when global ice sheets may have reached the equator and created a "Snowball Earth" lasting about 100 million years. The earliest fossils of complex life are found in the Tonian period in the form of Otavia, a primitive sponge, and the earliest fossil evidence of metazoan radiation are found in the Ediacaran period, which included the namesaked Ediacaran biota as well as the oldest definitive cnidarians and bilaterians in the fossil record.

According to Rino and co-workers, the sum of the continental crust formed in the Pan-African orogeny and the Grenville orogeny makes the Neoproterozoic the period of Earth's history that has produced most continental crust.

== Geology ==
At the onset of the Neoproterozoic the supercontinent Rodinia, which had assembled during the late Mesoproterozoic, straddled the equator. During the Tonian, rifting commenced which broke Rodinia into a number of individual land masses.

Possibly because most continents were then positioned at low latitudes, several large-scale glacial events occurred during the Neoproterozoic Era including the Sturtian and Marinoan glaciations of the Cryogenian Period.

These glaciations are believed to have been so severe that there were ice sheets at the equator—a state known as the "Snowball Earth".

== Subdivisions ==
Neoproterozoic time is subdivided into the Tonian (1000–720 Ma), Cryogenian (720–635 Ma) and Ediacaran (635–538.8 Ma) periods.

=== Russian regional timescale ===
In the regional timescale of Russia, the Tonian and Cryogenian correspond to the Late Riphean; the Ediacaran corresponds to the Early to middle Vendian. Russian geologists divide the Neoproterozoic of Siberia into the Mayanian (from 1000 to 850 Ma) followed by the Baikalian (from 850 to 650 Ma).

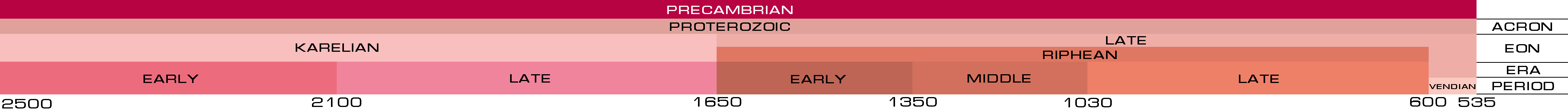
Russian timescale for the Proterozoic. Neoproterozoic is equivalent to the time span from Late Riphean to Late Vendian.

== Paleobiology ==
The idea of the Neoproterozoic Era was introduced in the 1960s. Nineteenth-century paleontologists set the start of multicellular life at the first appearance of hard-shelled arthropods called trilobites and archeocyathid sponges at the beginning of the Cambrian Period. In the early 20th century, paleontologists started finding fossils of multicellular animals that predated the Cambrian. A complex fauna was found in South West Africa in the 1920s but was inaccurately dated. Another fauna was found in South Australia in the 1940s, but it was not thoroughly examined until the late 1950s. Other possible early animal fossils were found in Russia, England, Canada, and elsewhere (see Ediacaran biota). Some were determined to be pseudofossils, but others were revealed to be members of rather complex biotas that remain poorly understood. At least 25 regions worldwide have yielded metazoan fossils older than the classical Precambrian–Cambrian boundary (which is currently dated at 538.8 million years ago).

A few of the early animals appear possibly to be ancestors of modern animals. Most fall into ambiguous groups of frond-like organisms; discoids that might be holdfasts for stalked organisms ("medusoids"); mattress-like forms; small calcareous tubes; and armored animals of unknown provenance.

These were most commonly known as Vendian biota until the formal naming of the Period, and are currently known as Ediacaran Period biota. Most were soft bodied. The relationships, if any, to modern forms are obscure. Some paleontologists relate many or most of these forms to modern animals. Others acknowledge a few possible or even likely relationships but feel that most of the Ediacaran forms are representatives of unknown animal types.

In addition to Ediacaran biota, two other types of biota were discovered in China. The Doushantuo Formation (of Ediacaran age) preserves fossils of microscopic marine organisms in great detail. The Huainan biota (of late Tonian age) consists of small worm-shaped organisms.

Molecular phylogeny suggests that animals may have emerged even earlier in the Neoproterozoic (early Tonian), but physical evidence for such animal life is lacking. Possible keratose sponge fossils have been reported in reefs dated to c. 890 million years before the present, but remain unconfirmed.

The widespread proliferation of marine algae during the Neoproterozoic caused an increased flux of algal particulate matter to benthic environments, stimulating the evolution of microbial eukaryotic predators.

== Terminal period ==
The nomenclature for the terminal period of the Neoproterozoic Era has been unstable. Russian and Nordic geologists referred to the last period of the Neoproterozoic as the Vendian, while Chinese geologists referred to it as the Sinian, and most Australians and North Americans used the name Ediacaran.

However, in 2004, the International Union of Geological Sciences ratified the Ediacaran Period to be a geological age of the Neoproterozoic, ranging from 635 to 538.8 (at the time to 542) million years ago. The Ediacaran Period boundaries are the only Precambrian boundaries defined by biologic Global Boundary Stratotype Section and Points, rather than the absolute Global Standard Stratigraphic Ages.

== See also ==
- Boring Billion – Earth history, 1.8 to 0.8 billion years ago
- Neoproterozoic oxygenation event
