= Jessie Donaldson Schultz =

American professor and social worker (1887–1976)

- Born: Jessica Louise Donaldson; August 17, 1887; St. Paul, Minnesota
- Died: June 30, 1976 (aged 88); Bozeman, Montana
- Other names: Jessie Donaldson, Jessie Schultz, Jessie Graham, Mrs. James Willard Schultz
- Citizenship: United States
- Education: University of Missoula, B.A. (1913), University of California, Master of Arts in Anthropology (1930)
- Occupations: Professor, social worker
- Employer(s): Montana State University, Works Progress Administration
- Known for: First Community Worker on Blackfeet Reservation, founder of Blackfeet Crafts Association

Jessica Louise Donaldson Schultz Graham (1887–1976) was an English professor at Montana State College and social worker on Native reservations in Montana and Wyoming.

== Early life and education ==
Jessie "Jessie" Louise Donaldson was born on August 17, 1887, in St. Paul, Minnesota to a wealthy family. She grew up in Minneapolis and McGregor, Iowa. Jessie earned her Bachelor of Arts from the University of Minnesota in 1913 and moved to Gallatin, Montana to become a rural schoolteacher.

== Career in teaching ==
Jessie spent 1915–1918 teaching rural schools in Graylin, Montana, and other small towns before taking a position as an instructor and then professor of English at Montana State College (now Montana State University), where she taught from 1918 to 1929. From 1923 to 1924, she served as acting head of the department.

While at Montana State College, Jessie organized a performance of The Mask of the Absaroka, a dramatic play that narrated the history of the Crow people (autonym Absaroka). Jessie served as the pageant master and founder/head of the Montana State College women's literary club the Eurodelphian Society, which produced the play. The play was successful in Bozeman, and she attempted to stage it in Yellowstone National Park as well. She was banned from doing so by English department head Professor William Brewer, who termed the production "an Indian camp."

Jessie was also interested in promoting female education, so she assisted in founding several organizations to assist women students at Montana State College, including Cap and Gown, the Women's Athletic Association, and the Spurs. In 1929, Jessie resigned from Montana State College and continued her education at the University of California, where she earned her Master of Arts in anthropology in 1930.

== Career in social work ==
In 1934, Jessie was hired by the Federal Emergency Relief Administration to work as the first social worker on Montana's Blackfeet Indian Reservation in Choteau, Montana. After three months in Choteau, she transferred to Browning, Montana. she followed up with working on the Shoshone and Arapaho tribes on Wyoming's Wind River Indian Reservation. She worked as the Community Worker with the Blackfeet in Browning from 1937 to 1941 under the Indian Service created by the Works Progress Administration, which replaced the Federal Emergency Relief Administration. In her work with the Blackfeet, Jessie drove the creation of the Blackfeet Cooperative Association, an arts and crafts organization on the reservation. From the beginning of her employment in 1934, Jessie assisted in improving marketing and production for the fledgling crafts business on the reservation and provided employment opportunities for Blackfeet women through the Civil Works Organization. By 1937, eight craft clubs existed, and by mid-1937, the official cooperative had been established. The crafts were sold both on the reservation and on craft stores in Glacier National Park. Jessie also assisted in establishing the Plains Indian Museum, a lending library in Browning, Montana, that opened in 1941, and a craft store for Blackfeet artists in St. Mary, Montana.

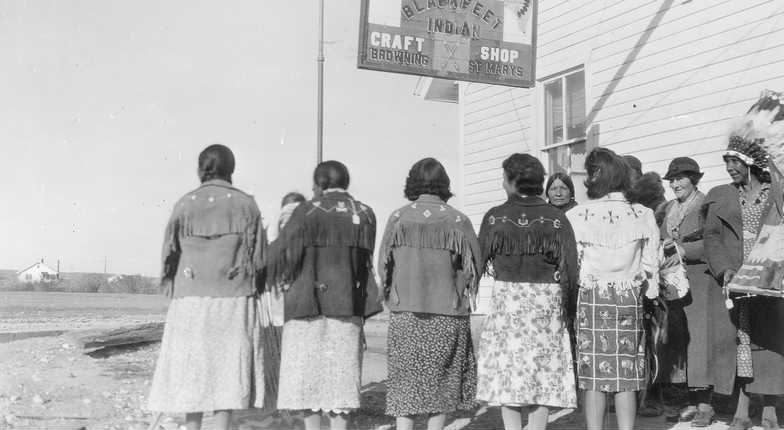
Blackfoot women displaying crafts at Browning craft shop

In 1940, Jessie transferred to Fort Washakie on the Wind River reservation, where she “worked with Shoshone and Northern Arapaho women to develop their arts and crafts enterprises.” She also established all-Native boards of directors for the Arapaho and Shoshone cooperatives. In 1953, Jessie retired from social work and began writing a variety of fiction and non-fiction works.

== Personal life ==
In 1927, while Graham was an English professor at Montana State College, she met James Willard Schultz. The two collaborated on the book The Sun God’s Children and married in 1931. Following Schultz's death in 1947 and her own retirement in 1953, Jessie moved to St. Helena, California to write, although she frequently visited Montana. Jessie married Harry L. Graham on June 14, 1966, in Mendocino, California. Jessie's published works “appeared in Ladies' Home Journal, Woman's Home Companion, Popular Mechanics, Montana the Magazine of Western History, and various educational journals”. She also composed a series of books for young children about Native American cultures and peoples that remain unpublished.

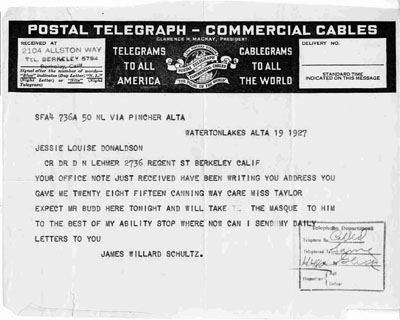
Postal telegraph sent from James Willard Schultz to Jessie Louise Donaldson

== Later years ==
In 1961, Montana State University awarded Jessie an Honorary Doctorate of Letters. In the late 1960s, she donated her collection of Native art, photographs, and the papers of her late husband, James Willard Schultz, to the Museum of the Rockies. From 1974 to 1975, Jessie funded a scholarship for Native American students at Montana State University called the James Willard Schultz Indian Heritage Award. Jessie Louise Donaldson Schultz Graham died on July 11, 1976, in Gallatin County, Montana.

== Publications ==
- Schultz, James Willard, and Jessie Louise Donaldson. The Sun God's Children. Boston, New York: Houghton Mifflin, 1930.
- Donaldson, Jessie Louise. 1931. A stylistic study of variants of the mentor-grandmother myth.
- Jessie Donaldson Schultz. "Adventuresome, Amazing Apikuni: Reflections on the Life and Work of James Willard Schultz as Seen by His Widow." Montana: The Magazine of Western History 10, no. 4 (1960): 2–18. Accessed June 3, 2020. www.jstor.org/stable/4516432.
