= Appekunny Formation =

Geological feature in Montana, US

Coordinates: 48°50′11″N 113°39′14″W

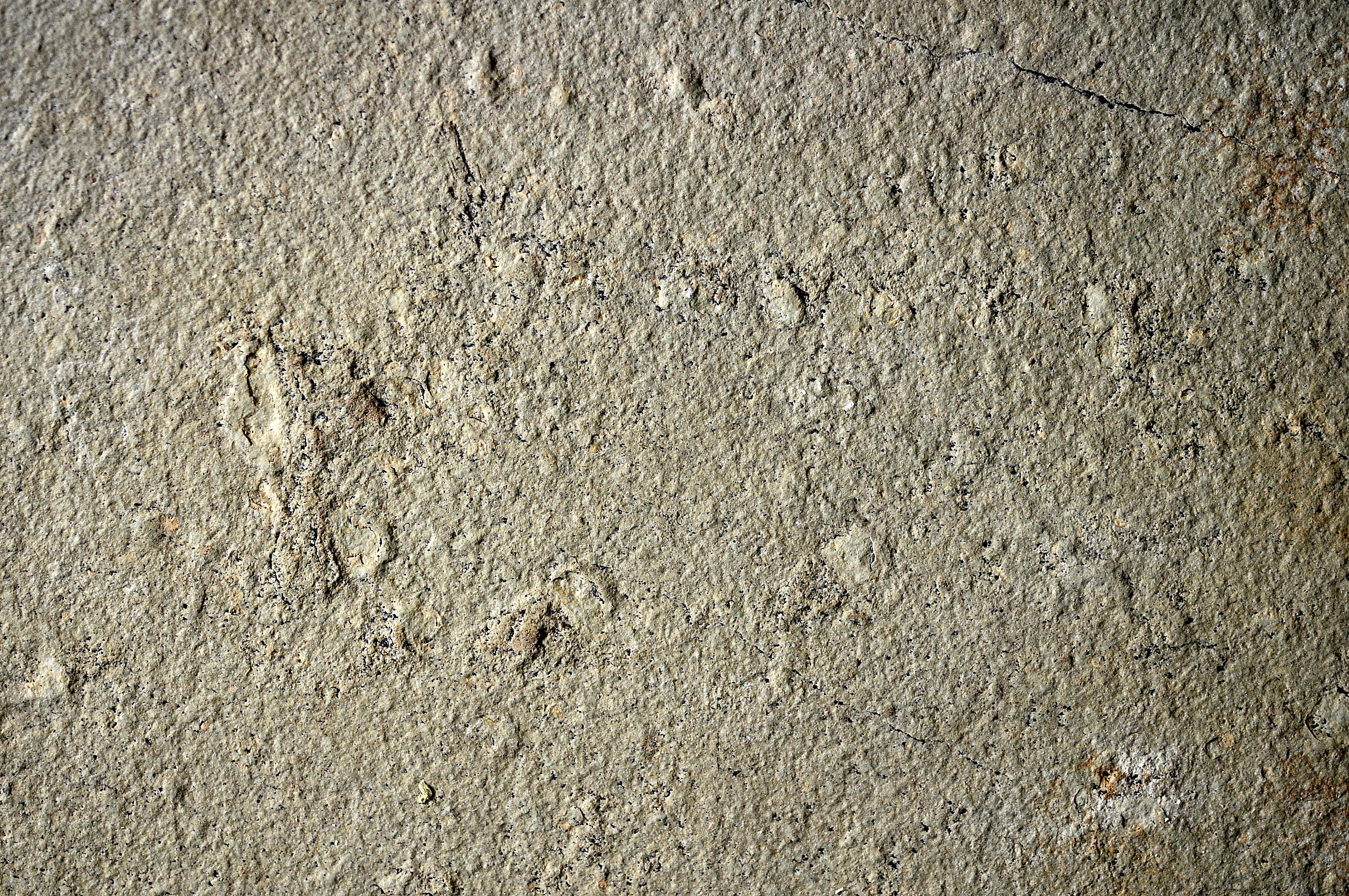
Horodyskia moniliformis Is one of the oldest forms of multicellar metaozoan life known

Appekunny Formation is a thick series of rock strata located in the Lewis Range within Glacier National Park, in the U.S. state of Montana. The formation is primarily mudstone and siltstone deposited in a shallow sea during the Proterozoic. Not far from the eastern entrance to the Going-to-the-Sun Road at St. Mary, Montana, the formation can be easily seen on the slopes of Singleshot Mountain. The Appekunny Formation contains bedding structures which may include the remains of the oldest metazoan (animal) on Earth known by the species name Horodyskia moniliformis.

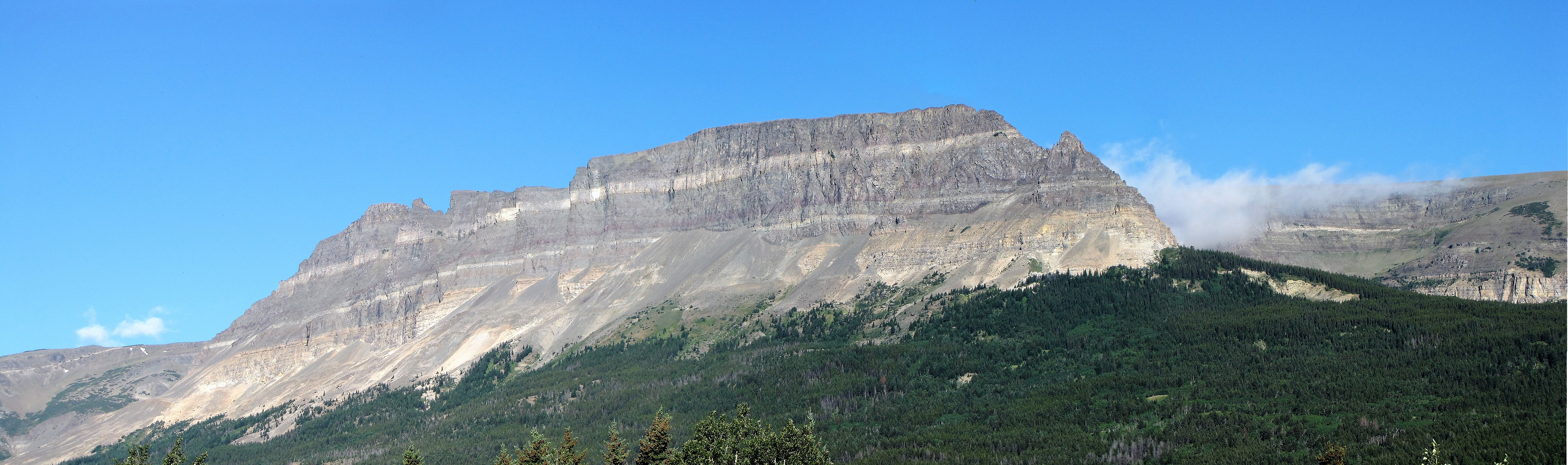
The sedimentary layers of the Appekunny Formation as seen on Singleshot Mountain

The Appekunny Formation is named after Apikuni Mountain and averages 1,970 feet (600 m) thick. The rock strata have been dated at between 1.2–1.4 billion years old.
