= Napi Rock =

Mountain in the state of Montana

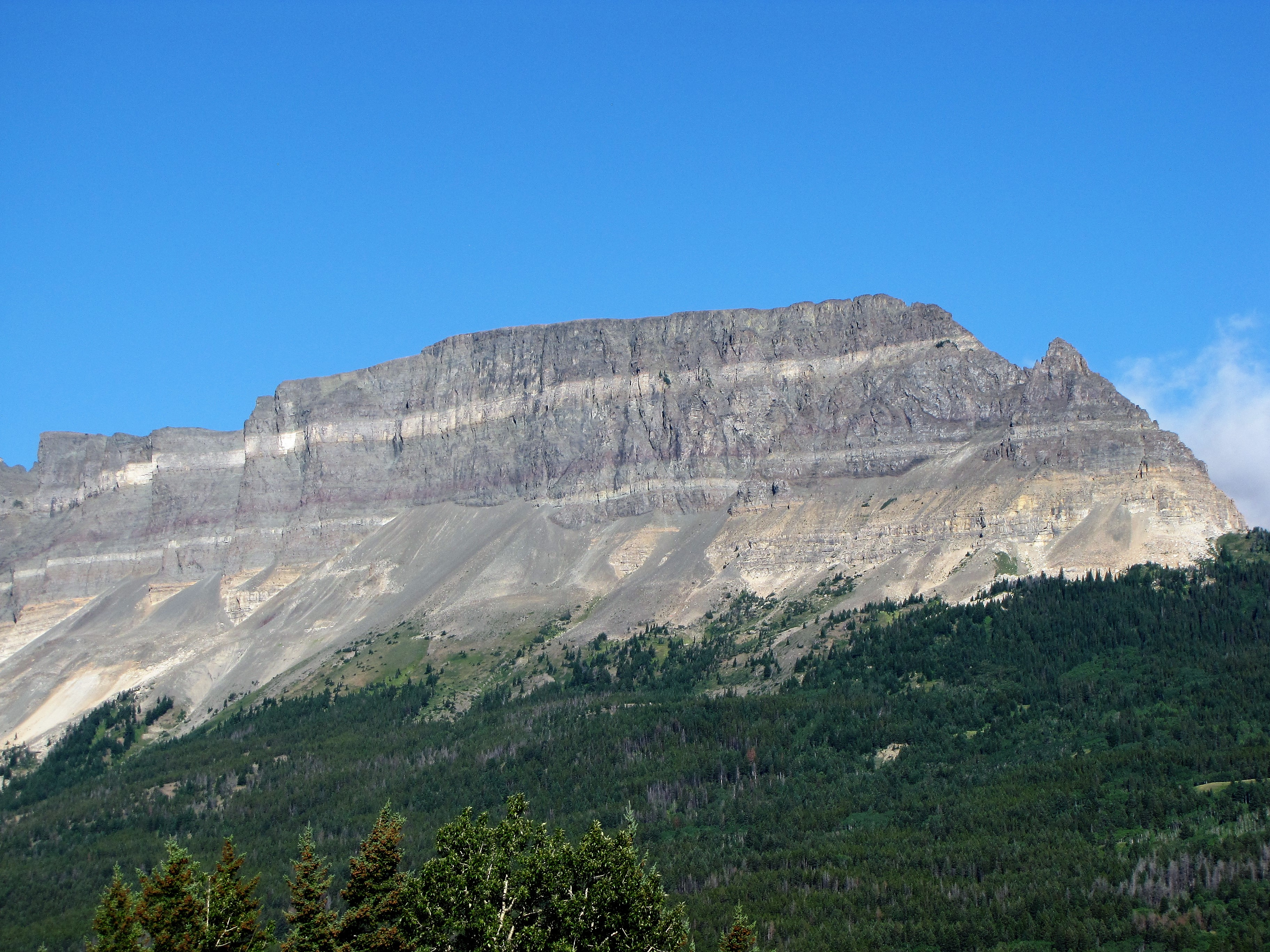
- Napi Rock is the pinnacle at right and to the left of Singleshot

Highest point
- Elevation: 7,487 ft (2,282 m)
- Prominence: 87 ft (27 m)
- Coordinates: 48°44′51″N 113°29′25″W

Geography
- Location within Montana Location within the United States
- Location: Glacier County, Montana, U.S.
- Parent range: Lewis Range
- Topo map: USGS Saint Mary MT

Climbing
- First ascent: Unknown
- Easiest route: class 3

Napi Rock (7,487 feet (2,282 m)) is located in the Lewis Range, Glacier National Park in the U.S. state of Montana. Napi Rock is a pinnacle on the eastern end of Singleshot Mountain and is easily seen from Saint Mary, Montana. Napi Rock is named for Napioa also known as Nah-pee, a fictional creation myth figure of the Blackfoot who was believed to have created the earth and everything on it.

== See also ==
- Mountains and mountain ranges of Glacier National Park (U.S.)
