= Tonian =

First period of the Neoproterozoic Era

- 1000 – ~720 Ma
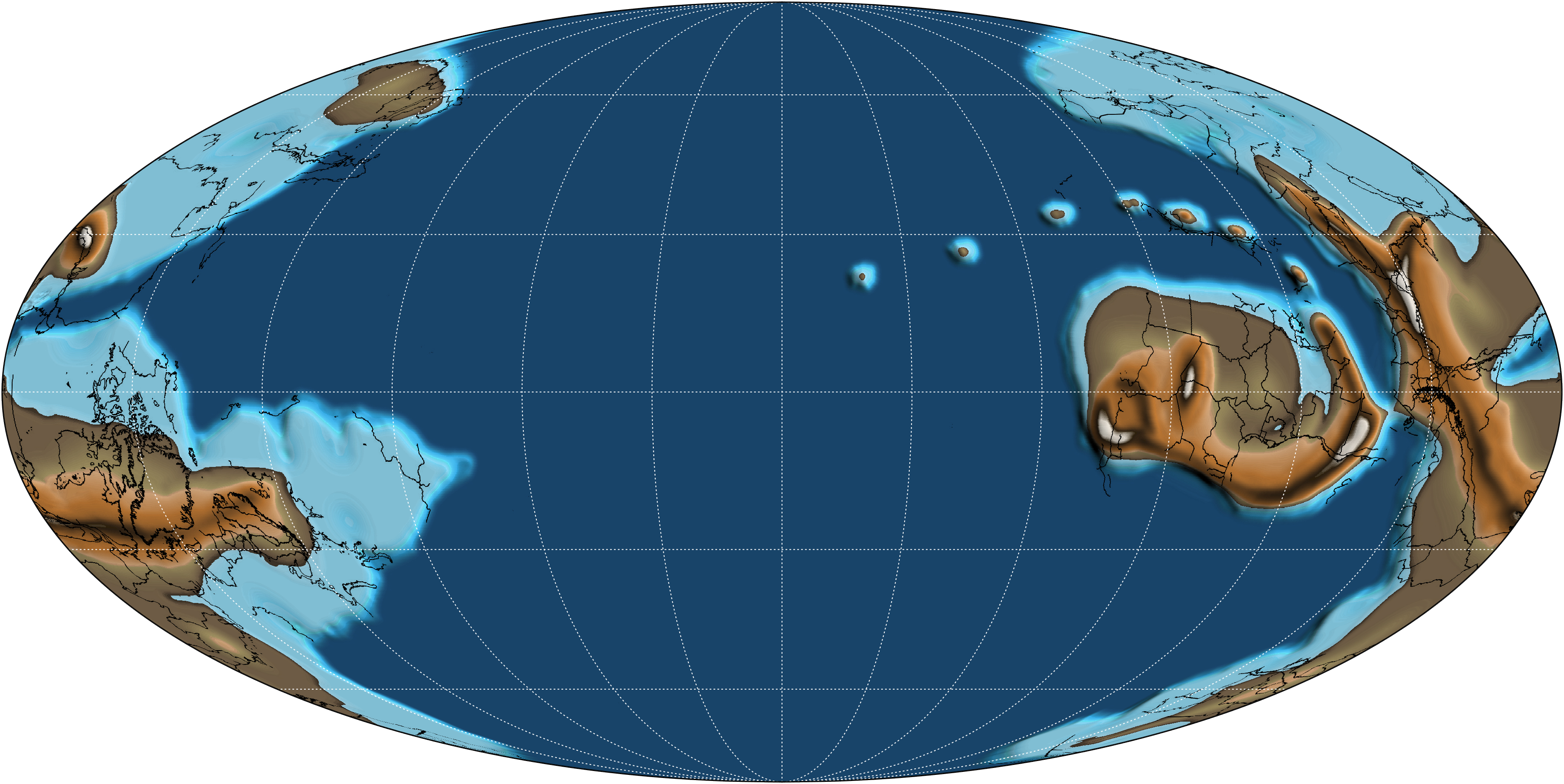
- A map of Earth as it appeared during the late Tonian, c. 750 Ma

Chronology
← / Beginning of the Sturtian glaciation; ← / First sponge-like animal?; ← / Sharp drop in the Stromatolite population; ← / End of the Boring Billion
Major glacial period
Events of the Tonian Period; Vertical axis scale: Millions of years ago

Etymology
- Name formality: Formal

Usage information
- Celestial body: Earth
- Regional usage: Global (ICS)
- Time scale(s) used: ICS Time Scale

Definition
- Chronological unit: Period
- Stratigraphic unit: System
- Time span formality: Formal
- Lower boundary definition: Defined chronometrically
- Lower GSSA ratified: 1990
- Upper boundary definition: Redefined chronometrically with an interim calibrated age of c. 720 Ma. GSSP is in progress. (Previously defined chronometrically as 850 Ma)
- Upper boundary definition candidates: The first appearance of widespread glaciation.
- Upper boundary GSSP candidate section(s): To be determined
- Upper GSSP ratified: Not formally defined

The Tonian (from Ancient Greek: τόνος, romanized: tónos, meaning "stretch") is the first geologic period of the Neoproterozoic Era. It lasted from 1000 to 720 Mya (million years ago). Instead of being based on stratigraphy, these dates are defined by the ICS based on radiometric chronometry. The Tonian is preceded by the Stenian Period of the Mesoproterozoic Era and followed by the Cryogenian.

== History ==
The Tonian was defined in 1990 by the New Precambrian time scale as being from 1000 to 850 Mya. The name Tonian comes from Ancient Greek: τόνος, romanized: tónos, which means "stretch", referring to the rifting that broke up the supercontinent Rodinia during this period. The upper definition was then redefined as 720 Mya in 2014 after discoveries that the original 850 Mya for the lower Cryogenian and the first glaciations at 717 Mya did not match. This is temporary until the basal Cryogenian GSSP is chosen.

== Geology ==
Both the supercontinent Rodinia and the Mirovian superocean remained stable throughout the early Tonian from 1000 to at least 900 Mya. The appearance of sedimentary rocks in multiple places between 850 and 800 Mya has been postulated as an initial breakup of Rodinia. However, there has been little evidence found for the breakup of Rodinia during the mid-Tonian, with most agreeing that Rodinia began breaking up at the end of the Tonian, around 750 Mya.

The first half of the Tonian has mildly fluctuating carbon isotope values, being transitional from the lower Mesoproterozoic levels to the higher Tonian levels. The later half of the Tonian has high carbon isotope values, with deep excursions happening at least once after 740 Mya, immediately before the Sturtian glaciation in the Cryogenian.

== Biology ==
The first putative metazoan (animal) fossils are dated to the middle to late Tonian (c. 890 to 800 Ma). Fossils of Otavia antiqua, which has been described as a primitive sponge by its discoverers and numerous other scholars, date back to about 800 Ma. Even earlier sponge-like fossils have been reported in reefs dating back to 890 Ma, but their identity is highly debated. This dating is consistent with molecular data recovered through genetic studies of modern metazoan species; more recent studies have concluded that the base of the animal phylogenetic tree is in the Tonian.

Tonian rocks preserve some of the earliest known fossils of macroalgae (seaweed), such as the benthic macroalgae from the Longfengshan biota of the Luotuoling Formation or the green algae from the Dolores Creek Formation. Arctacellularia tetragonala, an alga found in this period, has chlorophyll derivatives preserved in it. Sinosabellidites huainanensis, another alga from the Huainan biota that was initially mistaken for an animal, was found in this period.

The first large evolutionary radiation of acritarchs occurred during the Tonian. Late Tonian sediments abound in vase-shaped microfossils that represent the earliest known testate amoebozoans. Stromatolites begin to decrease swiftly during this period.

Fungi are visibly preserved in this period in 810 to 715 million year old shale in the Mbuji-Mayi Supergroup with mycelia-like filaments.

== See also ==
- Boring Billion – Earth history, 1.8 to 0.8 billion years ago
- Neoproterozoic oxygenation event
- Huainan biota
