= Pumpelly Pillar =

Peak in Montana, United States

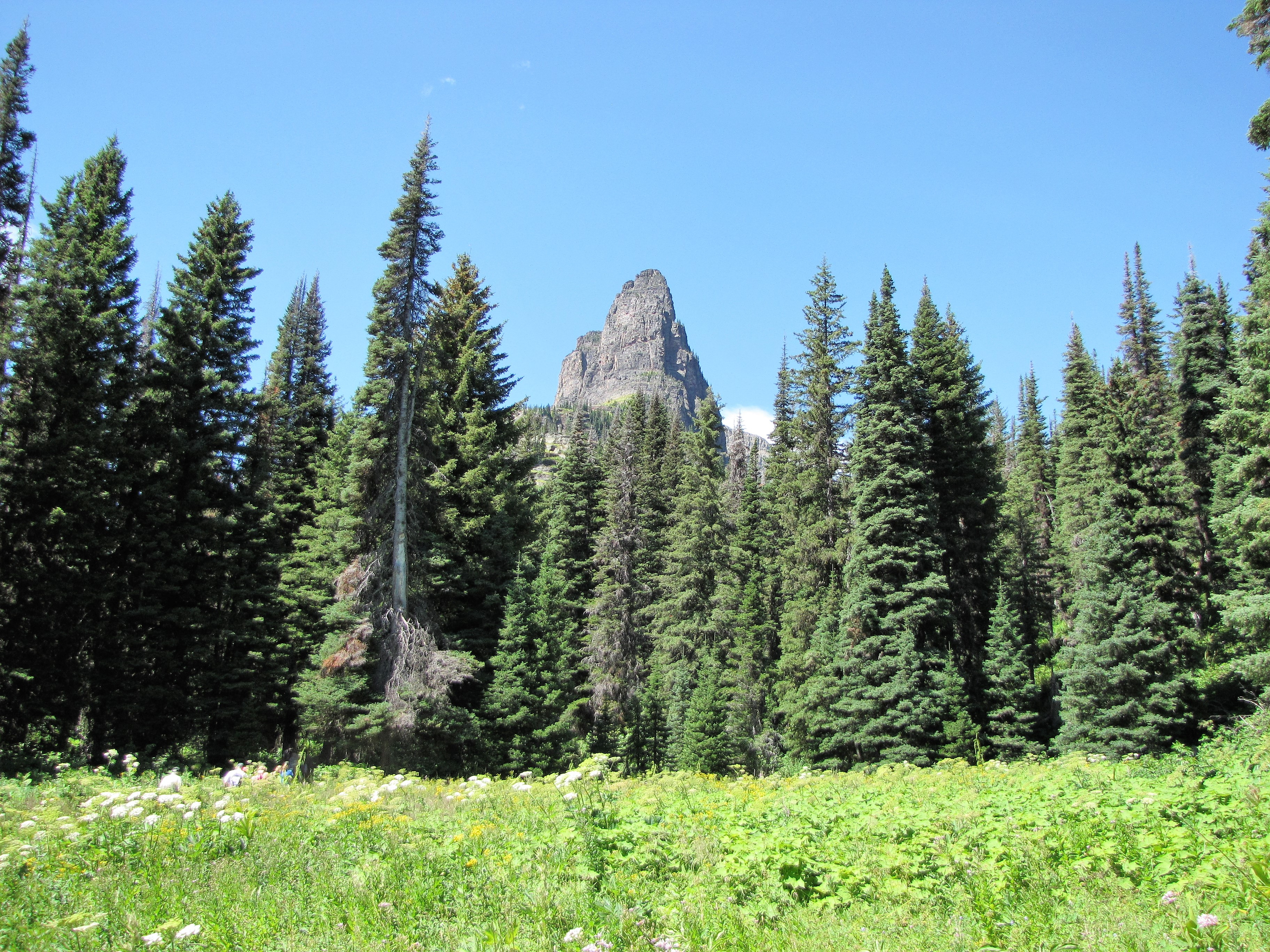
- Pumpelly Pillar from the Twin Falls trail

Highest point
- Elevation: 7,625 ft (2,324 m)
- Prominence: 180 ft (55 m)
- Coordinates: 48°28′29″N 113°27′02″W

Geography
- Location within Montana Location within the United States
- Location: Glacier County, Montana, U.S.
- Parent range: Lewis Range
- Topo map: USGS Many Glacier MT

Climbing
- First ascent: Prehistoric
- Easiest route: Scramble class 2-3

Pumpelly Pillar (7,625 feet (2,324 m)) is located in the Lewis Range, Glacier National Park in the U.S. state of Montana. Located in the Two Medicine region in the southeastern section of Glacier National Park, the peak is likely named after Raphael Pumpelly, who lead the Northern Transcontinental Railway Survey party that crossed Pitamakan Pass in 1883.

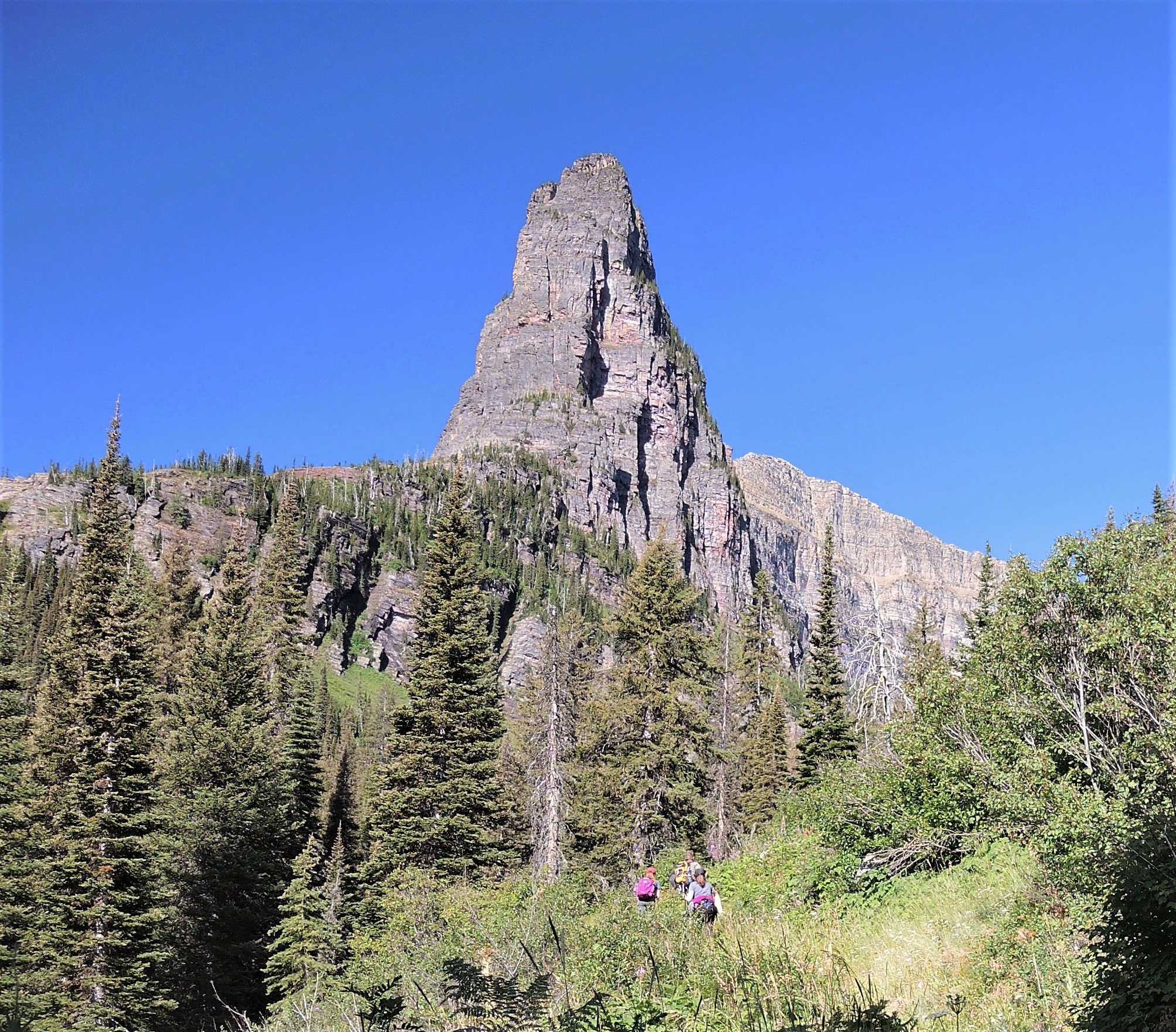
Pumpelly Pillar

== See also ==
- Mountains and mountain ranges of Glacier National Park (U.S.)
