= Sinosabellidites =

Sinosabellidites Temporal range: Tonian

Scientific classification
- Domain: Eukaryota
- Clade: Archaeplastida
- Order: †Sinosabelliditida
- Family: †Sinosabelliditidae
- Genus: †Sinosabellidites; Zheng 1980
- Species: †S. huainanensis

Binomial name
- †Sinosabellidites huainanensis Zheng 1980

Species of Early Neoproterozoic metazoans

Sinosabellidites huainanensis is a species of Early Neoproterozoic algae, within the Huainan biota. When described, its worm-like shape and annulated appearance led it to be mistaken for an animal. S. huainanensis has two ends which are both bulbous and form the sausage-like shape present in the majority of coeval specimens.
