= Castle Rocks =

Mountain in California, United States

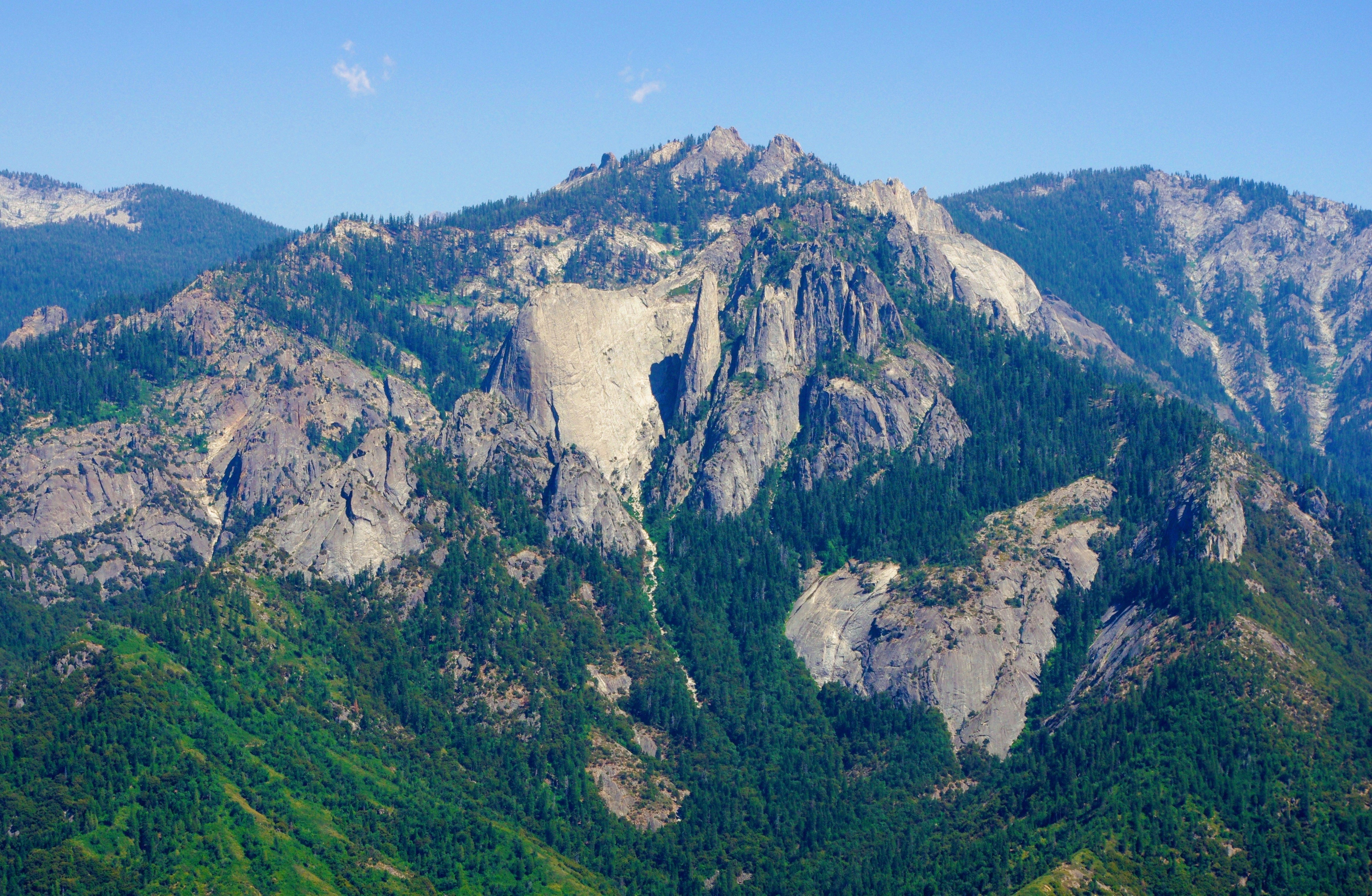
- Northwest aspect

Highest point
- Elevation: 9,088 ft (2,770 m)
- Prominence: 481 ft (147 m)
- Parent peak: Paradise Peak (9,362 ft)
- Isolation: 1.34 mi (2.16 km)
- Coordinates: 36°29′46″N 118°42′09″W

Geography
- Location within California Location within the United States
- Country: United States
- State: California
- County: Tulare
- Protected area: Sequoia National Park
- Parent range: Sierra Nevada
- Topo map: USGS Silver City

Geology
- Rock age: Early Cretaceous
- Rock type(s): Granodiorite and Granite

Climbing
- Easiest route: class 4

Castle Rocks is a 9,088-foot-elevation (2,770-meter) mountain summit in Tulare County, California, United States.

== Description ==
Castle Rocks is part of the Sierra Nevada mountain range and is set in Sequoia National Park. The highest point of the mountain is unofficially called Amphitheater Dome. Precipitation runoff from the mountain drains into Castle, Dome, and Paradise creeks which are tributaries of the Middle Fork Kaweah River. Topographic relief is significant as the summit rises 5,700 feet (1,737 meters) above the river in three miles (4.8 km). This mountain's toponym was officially adopted on October 3, 1928, by the United States Board on Geographic Names.

== Climate ==
According to the Köppen climate classification system, Castle Rocks is located in an alpine climate zone. Most weather fronts originate in the Pacific Ocean, and travel east toward the Sierra Nevada mountains. As fronts approach, they are forced upward by the peaks (orographic lift), causing them to drop their moisture in the form of rain or snowfall onto the range.

== Climbing ==
- Castle Rock Spire - class 5.9 - First ascent April 28, 1950 - William Siri, Bill Long, Jim Wilson, Al Steck, Phil Bettler
- West Face of Castle Rock Spire - class 5.9 - FA 1969 - Fred Beckey, Galen Rowell, Mort Hempel, Ben Borson
- East Face of Castle Rock Spire - class 5.10 - FA July 2013 - Daniel Jeffcoach, Tom Ruddy

Rock-climbing routes on The Fin:

- Charley Knapp Route - class 5.9 - First ascent May 23, 1984 - Patrick Paul, Herb Laeger, Ron Carson
- Silver Lining - class 5.9 - FA May 26, 1985 - Patrick Paul, Herb Laeger, Eve Laeger, Ron Carson
- Aspire - class 5.9 - FA May 1986 - Herb Laeger, Richard Leversee
- North Buttress - class 5.10 - FA June 26, 1997 - Dave Nettle, Richard Leversee, Kevin Daniels
- Cutting Edge - class 5.9 - FA 2017 - Vitaliy Musiyenko, Daniel Jeffcoach
- Super Totally Trad - class 5.11 - FA 2017 - Vitaliy Musiyenko, Jeremy Ross
- Tainted Love - class 5.11 - FA 2017 - Vitaliy Musiyenko, Chaz Langelier

Other routes:

- The Gargoyle on South Guard - class 5.10 - FA 1983 - Herb Laeger, Eve Laeger, Rich Smith
- Beckey Route North Buttress of Amphitheater Dome - class 5.8 - 1968 - Fred Beckey, Roger Briggs, Jim Jones, Dave Leen

== See also ==
- List of mountain peaks of California

== Gallery ==
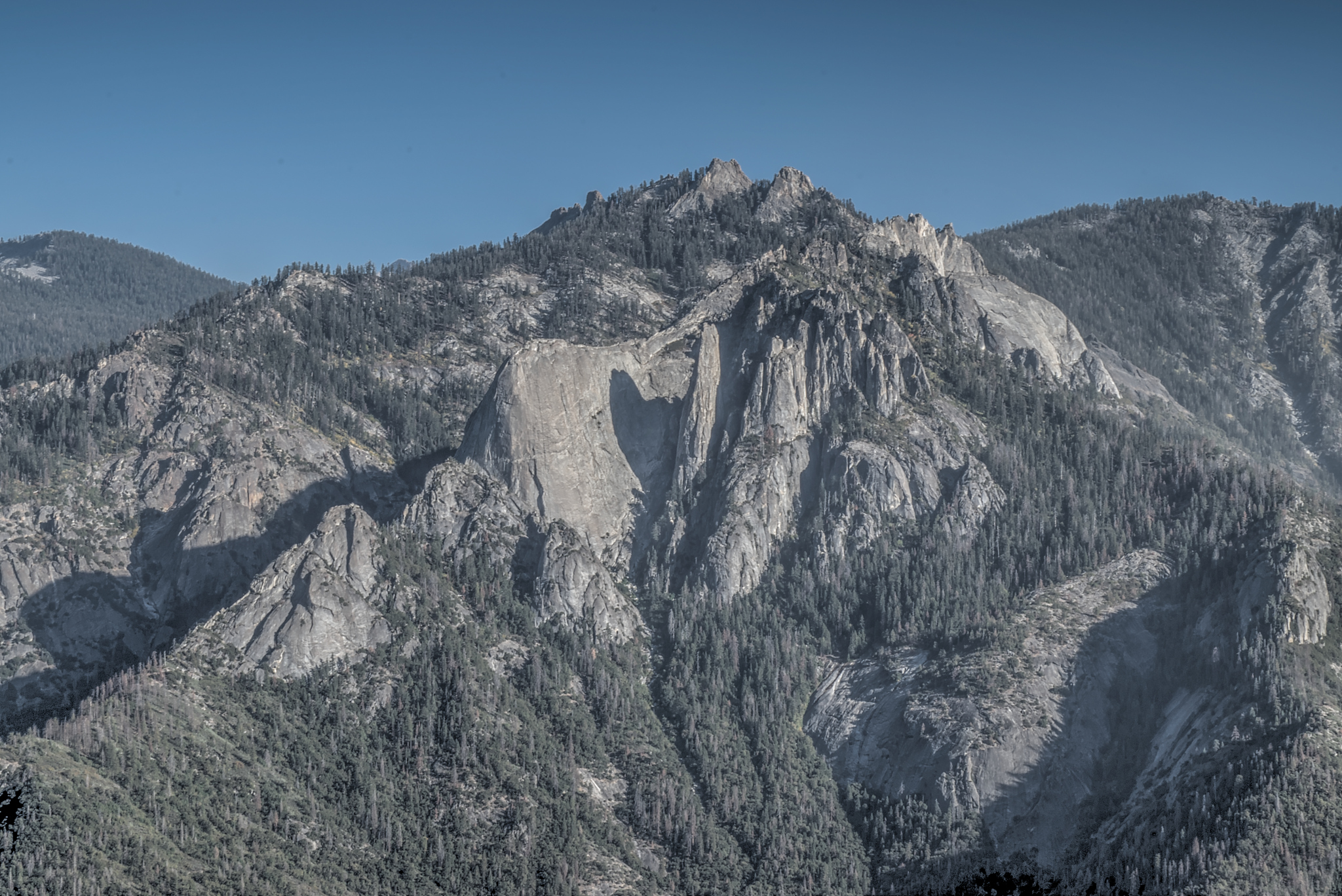
Northwest aspect, viewed from Moro Rock

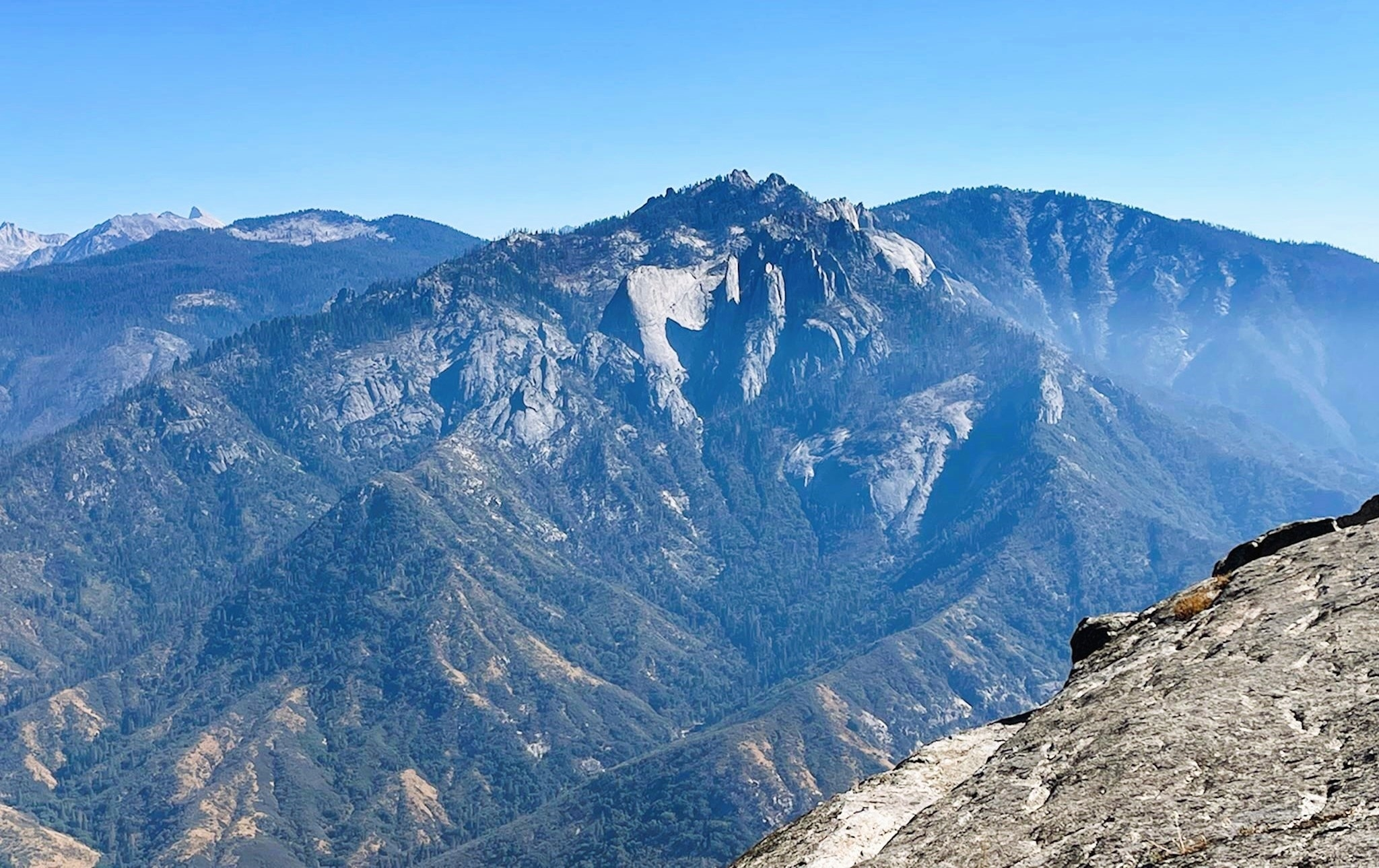
Northwest aspect, viewed from Moro Rock

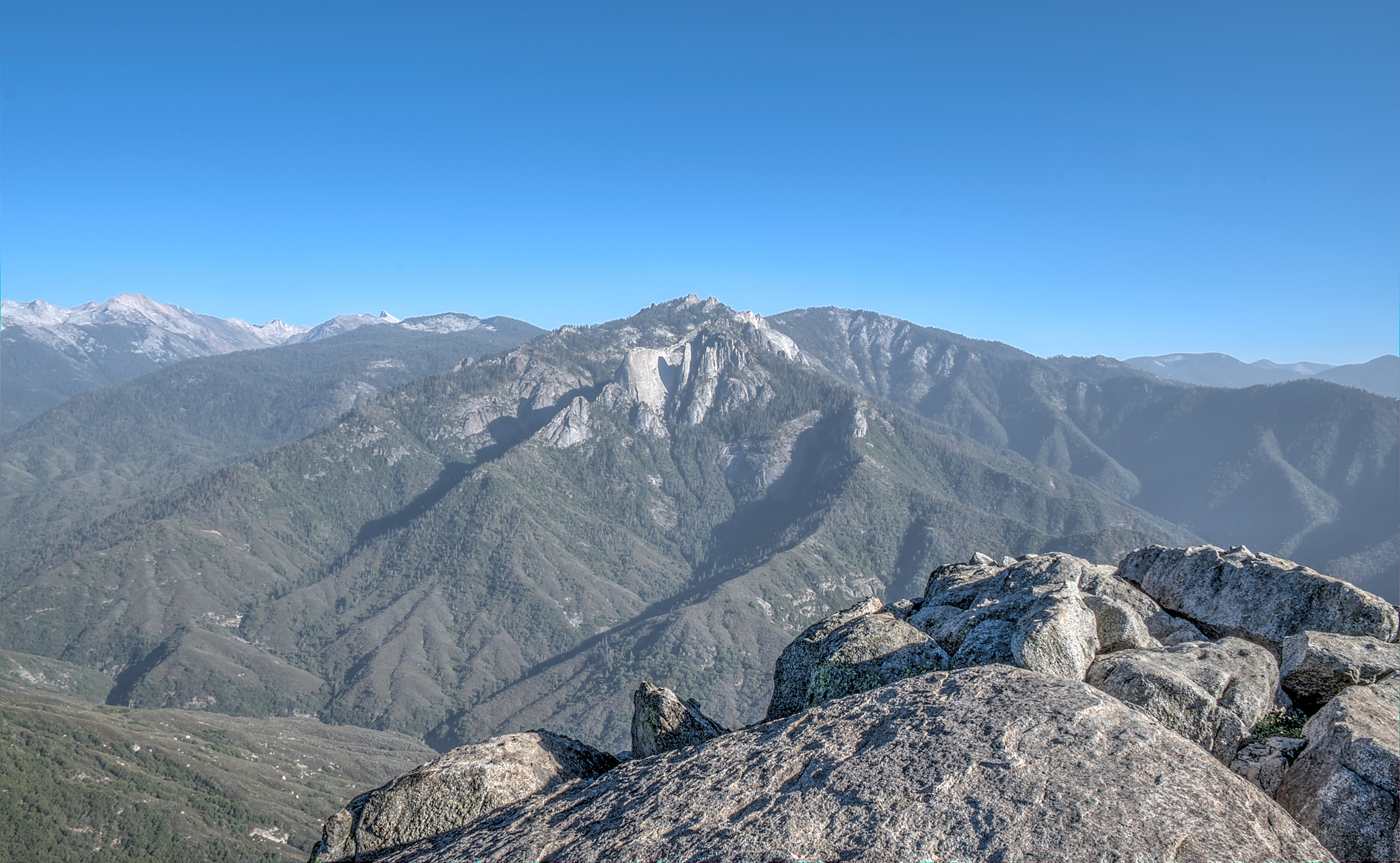
Castle Rocks (centered)

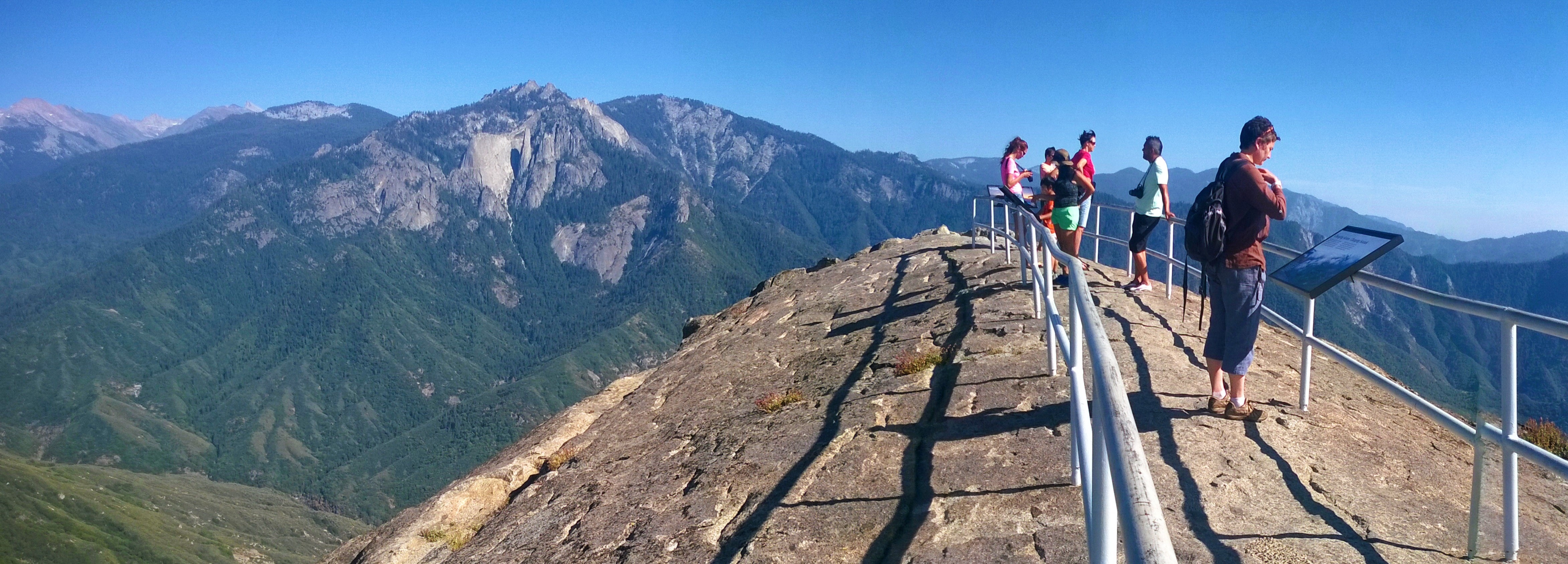
Castle Rocks (left of center), viewed from top of Moro Rock

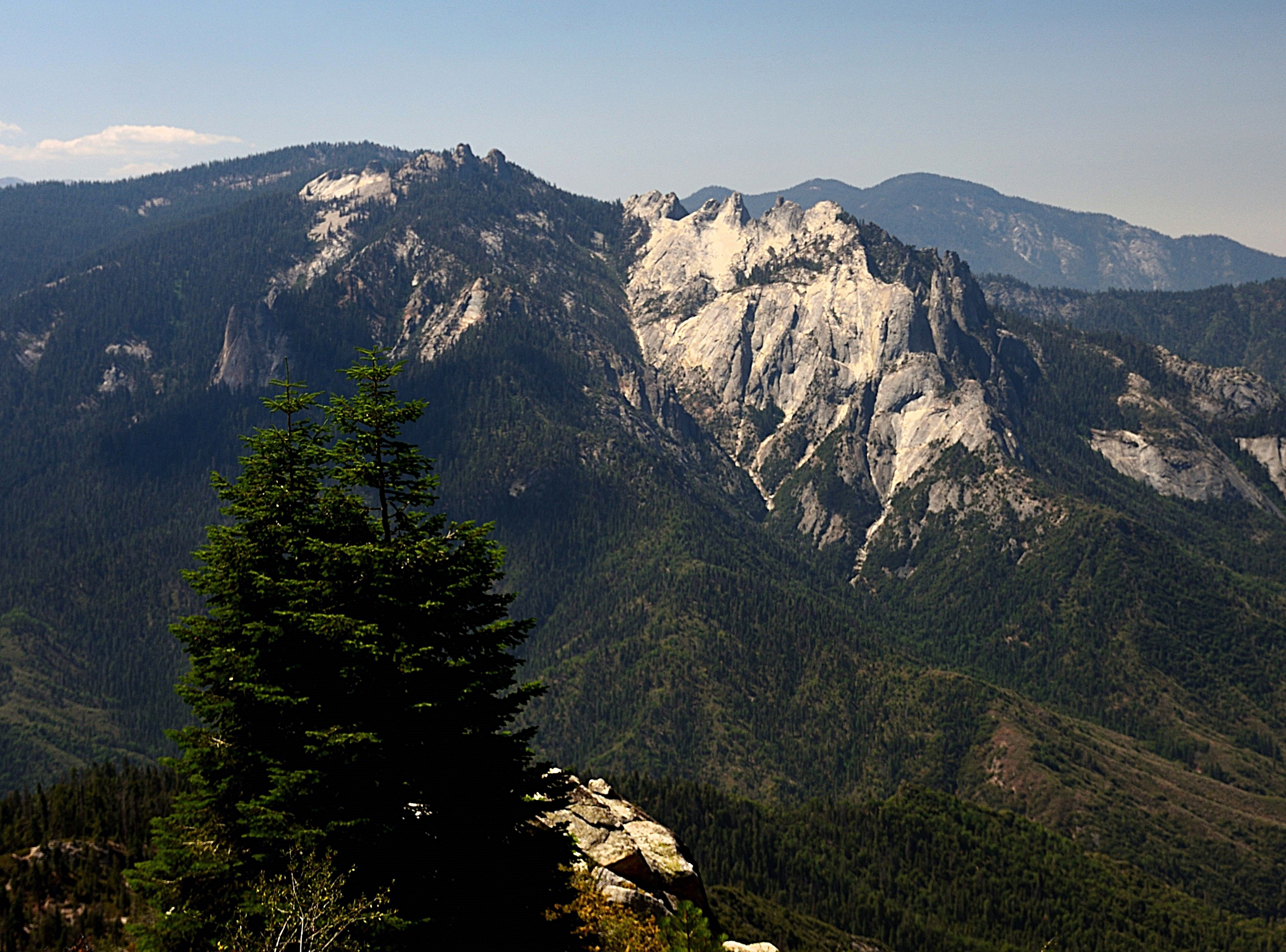
North aspect viewed from Panther Gap
