= East Flattop Mountain =

Mountain in the state of Montana

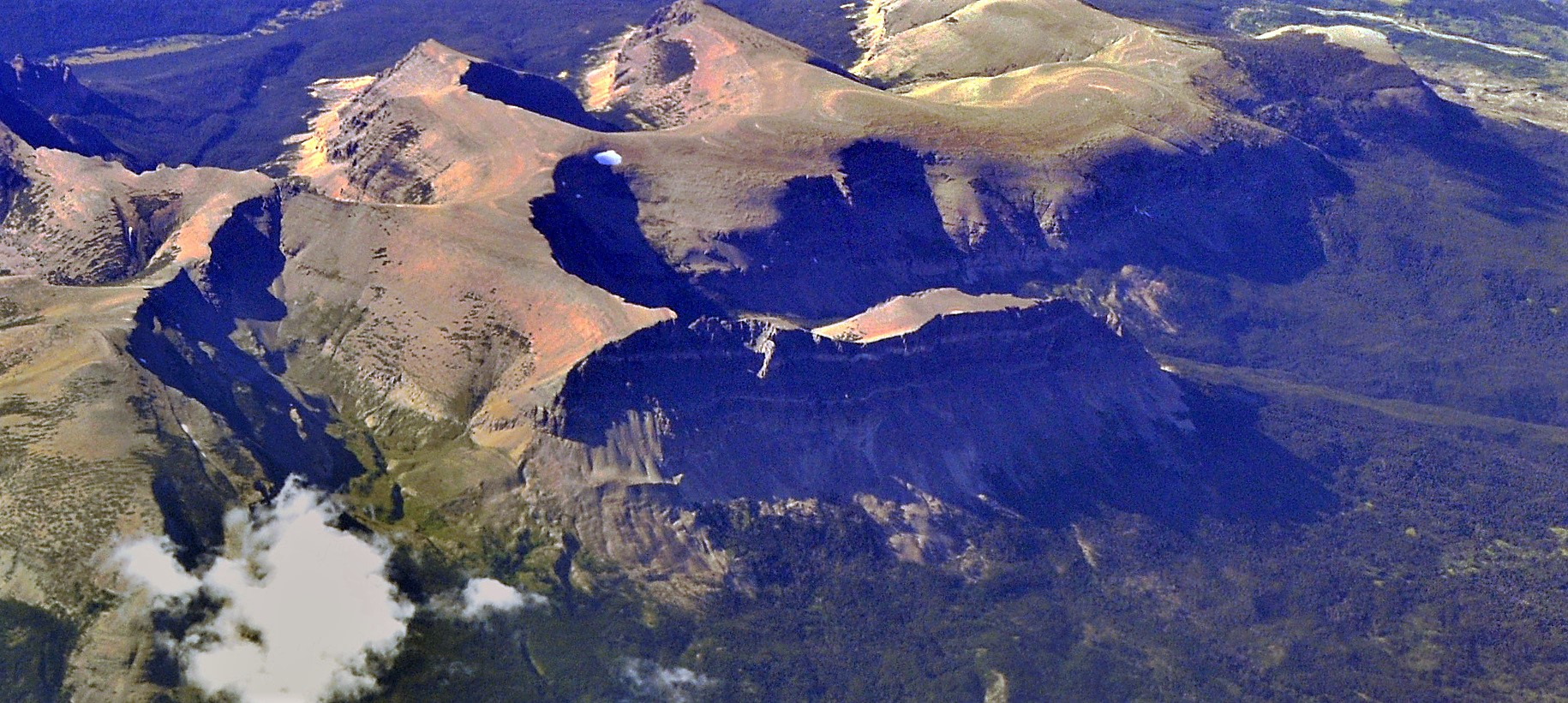
- Aerial view of East Flattop Mountain

Highest point
- Elevation: 8,361 ft (2,548 m) NAVD 88
- Prominence: 596 ft (182 m)
- Coordinates: 48°44′22″N 113°31′16″W

Geography
- Location within Montana Location within the United States
- Location: Glacier County, Montana, U.S.
- Parent range: Lewis Range
- Topo map(s): USGS Rising Sun, MT

Climbing
- First ascent: Unknown
- Easiest route: Scramble

East Flattop Mountain (8,361 feet (2,548 m)) is located in the Lewis Range, Glacier National Park in the U.S. state of Montana. East Flattop Mountain rises to the north above Saint Mary Lake and is easily seen from the eastern entrance to the Going-to-the-Sun Road and the village of St. Mary, Montana.

== See also ==
- Mountains and mountain ranges of Glacier National Park (U.S.)

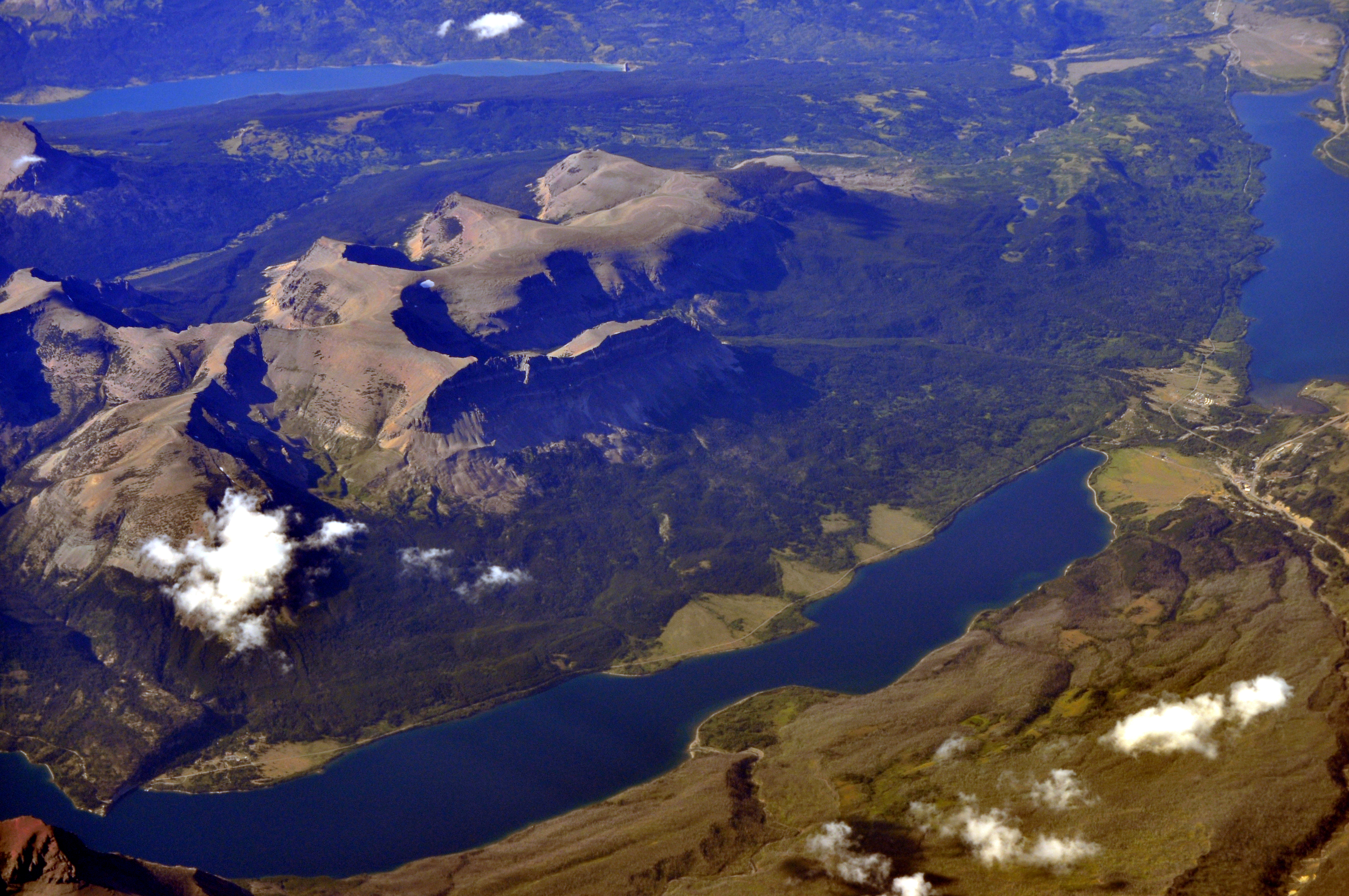
Aerial of East Flattop, St. Mary Lake & Lower St. Mary Lake, and Lake Sherburne (upper left)
