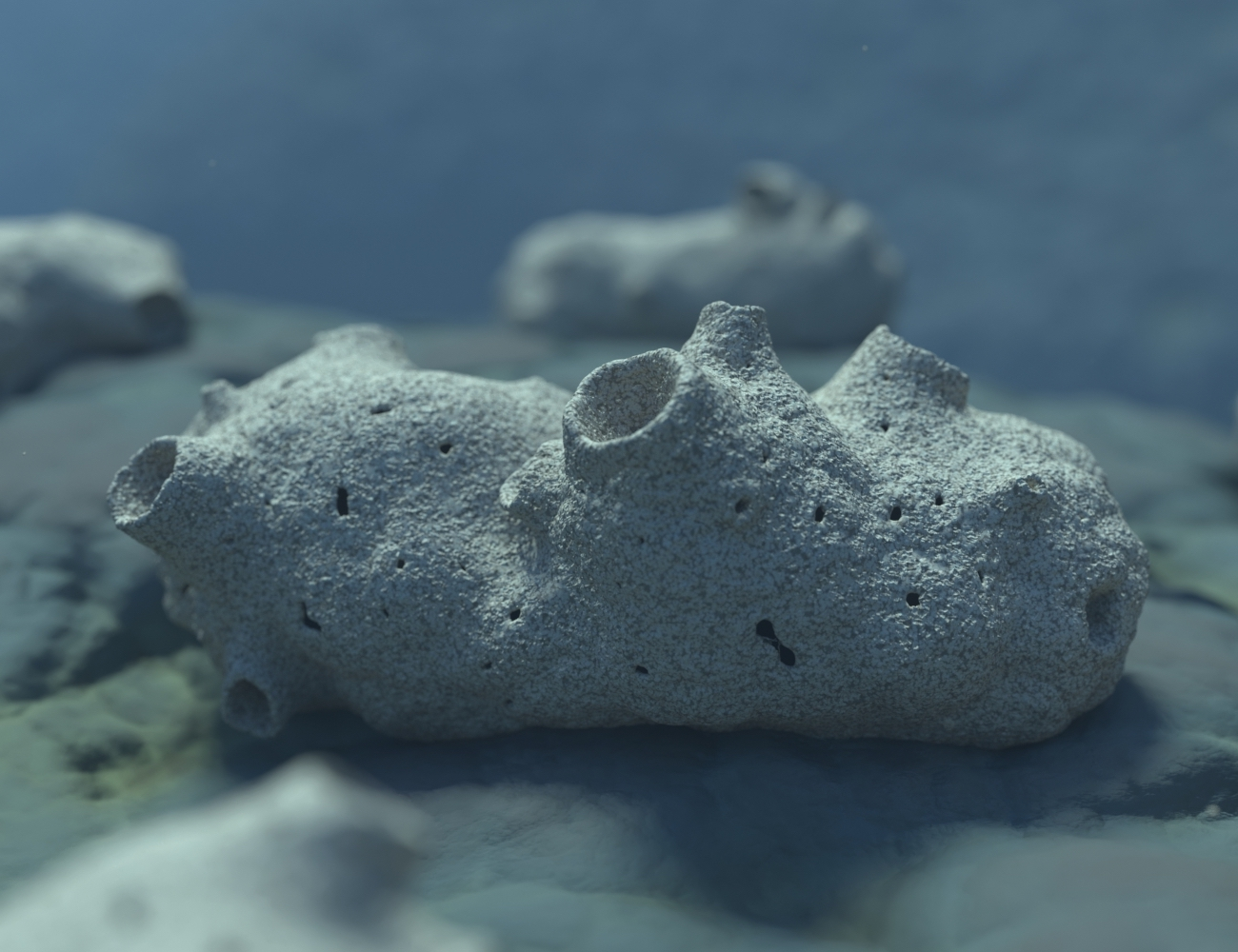
- Life reconstruction of Otavia antiqua
- Fossil

Scientific classification
- Kingdom: Animalia
- Genus: †Otavia; Brain et al., 2012
- Species: †O. antiqua

Binomial name
- †Otavia antiqua Brain et al., 2012

= Otavia =

Otavia Temporal range: Tonian – Ediacaran 720–570 Ma

Extinct genus of sponges

Otavia is an extinct monospecific genus of ancient sponge-like animal found in the Otavi Group (the generic name being the namesake) in the Etosha National Park, Namibia. It is claimed to be the oldest animal fossil, being found in rock aged between 760 and 550 million years. The oldest Otavia fossils are from the Tonian period, before the Cryogenian glaciations, but the latest found were from the Nama Group rocks of the Ediacaran period.

The affinities of these fossils, along with other paleontological evidence for Precambrian sponges, are disputed.

Some researchers propose that Otavia antiqua may have evolved over 100 million years earlier than previously thought, which supports the ‘molecular clock’ predictions that sponges were among the first animals to appear.

Some scientists theorized that the burial of Otavia may have actually contributed to carbon burial and to the rising in oxygen levels during the Neoproterozoic. Furthermore, Otavia antiqua fossils are present in strata both before and after major glaciation events, indicating the organism may have survived the extreme conditions of ‘Snowball Earth’.

== Discovery and Naming ==
Some of the earliest evidence of animal evolution can be found in fossils from the Ediacaran period, which show early diversification of precambrian animals.

In the Namibian Otavi and Nama groups, samples of black limestone were collected, and dissolved in acetic acid. This produced over a thousand individual specimens of a small sponge-like fossil.

A 2012 paper, Brain et al. (2012), described these specimens, placing them in the genus which they named 'Otavia', after the Otavi group which many of the samples that specimens were found in were from, and gave it the species name 'antiqua'.

== Description ==
The shape of Otavia fossils is irregular but rounded, and the size varies from one-third of a millimetre to 5 millimetres (0.20 in). They are hollow inside, and have many small, osculum-like holes connecting the interior to the outside, similar in body plan to most poriferans.

Otavia antiqua fossils have more complex internal anatomical features, including small incurrent pores (ostia), layered chambered labyrinths, and cavities which are connected to larger excurrent openings (oscula), consistent with a sponge-like body plan. The internal cavities are often filled with geopetal sediment, suggesting the organisms were hollow during life and infilled after death. Their structure also lacks features typical of microbial fossils, supporting an animal rather than microbial origin.

The material of the outer wall is predominantly calcium phosphate. In addition to calcium phosphate, the fossils also contain calcite and dolomite.

== See also ==
- Huainan biota
