= Singleshot Mountain =

Montana, USA – 7926 ft/2416 m

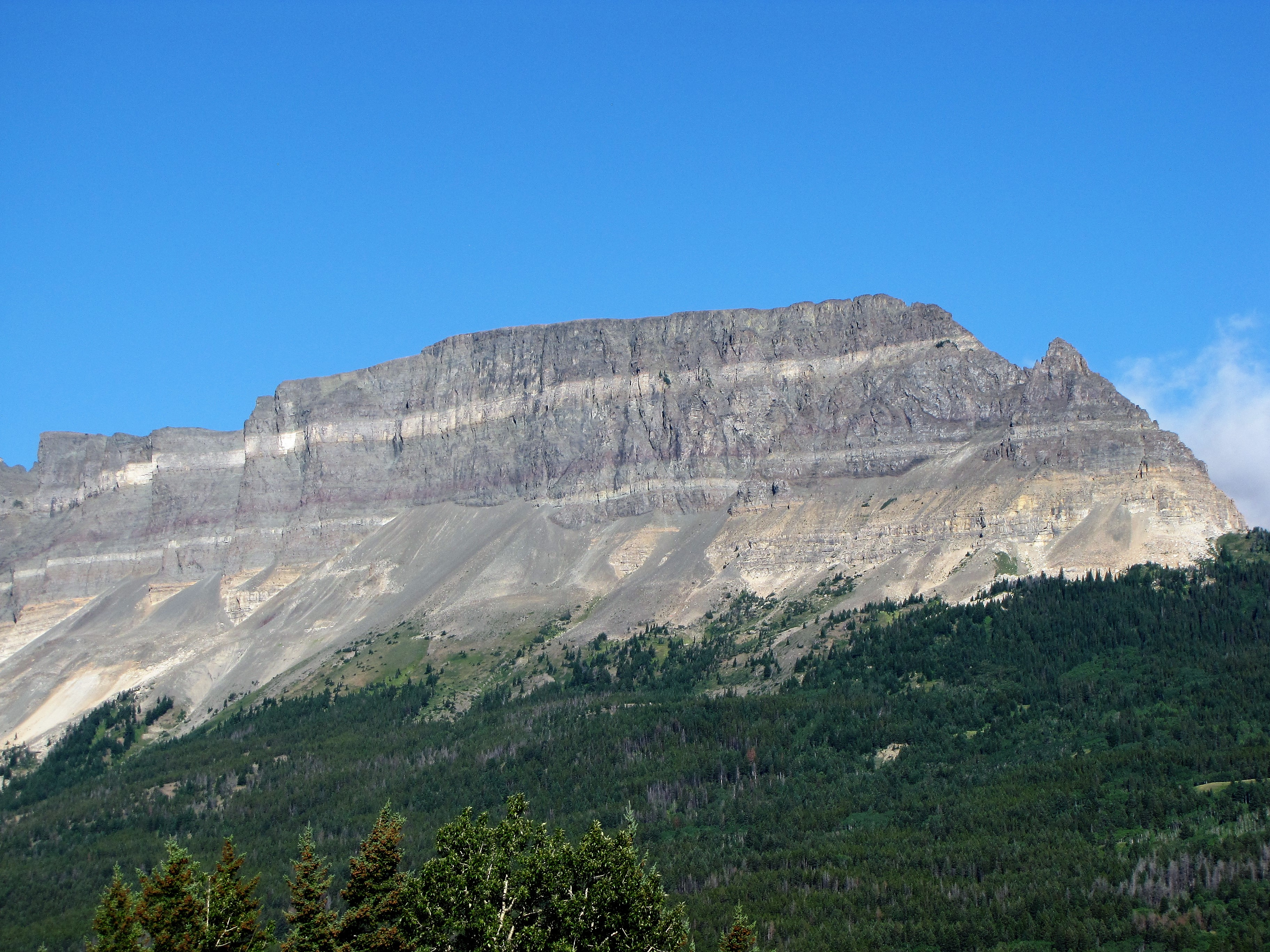
- Singleshot Mountain high point at far left with Napi Rock at right

Highest point
- Elevation: 7,930 ft (2,420 m)
- Prominence: 206 ft (63 m)
- Coordinates: 48°44′29″N 113°29′50″W

Geography
- Location within Montana Location within the United States
- Location: Glacier County, Montana, U.S.
- Parent range: Lewis Range
- Topo map: USGS Saint Mary MT

Climbing
- First ascent: Unknown
- Easiest route: Hike

Singleshot Mountain (7,930 feet (2,417 m)) is located in the Lewis Range, Glacier National Park in the U.S. state of Montana. The mountain is easily seen from Saint Mary, Montana and was named after the single-shot fired from a rifle by George Bird Grinnell when dispatching a Bighorn sheep while hunting for food in 1885 during park explorations. The sedimentary layers of the Appekunny Formation are clearly displayed on the southeastern cliffs of Singleshot Mountain.

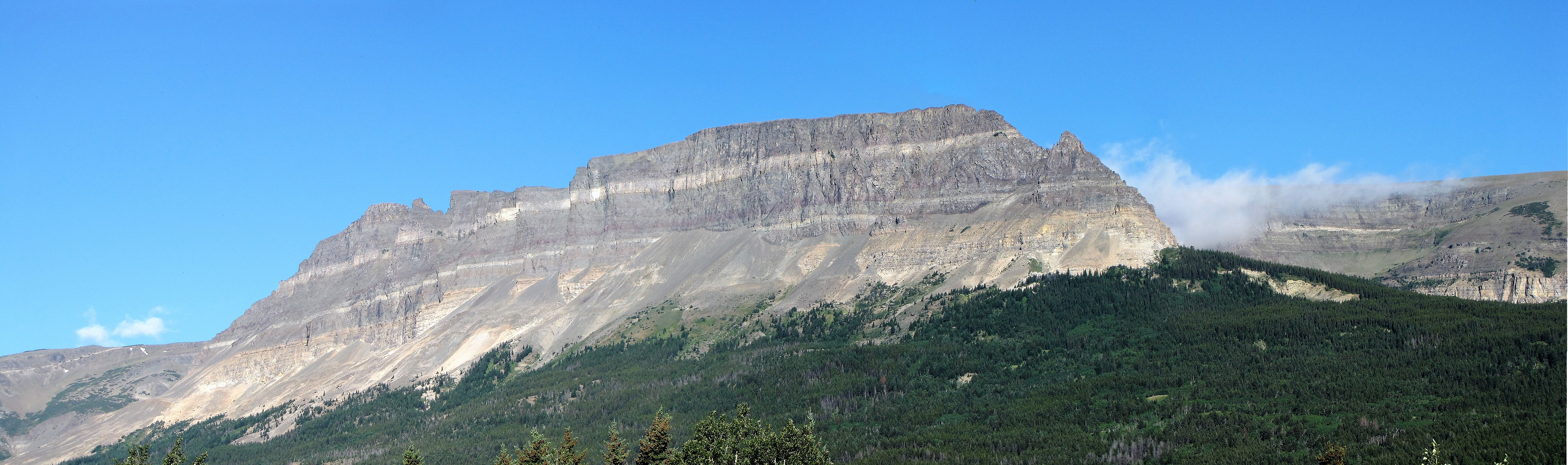
Wide view of Singleshot Mountain

== See also ==
- Mountains and mountain ranges of Glacier National Park (U.S.)
