= Eoarchean geology =

Study of the oldest crustal fragments on Earth

Eoarchean geology is the study of the oldest preserved crustal fragments of Earth during the Eoarchean era from 4.031 to 3.6 billion years ago. Major well-preserved rock units dated to this era are known from three localities, the Isua Greenstone Belt in Southwest Greenland, the Acasta Gneiss in the Slave Craton in Canada, and the Nuvvuagittuq Greenstone Belt on the eastern coast of Hudson Bay in Quebec. From the dating of rocks in these three regions, scientists suggest that the beginning of plate tectonics could have started as far back as early as the Eoarchean.

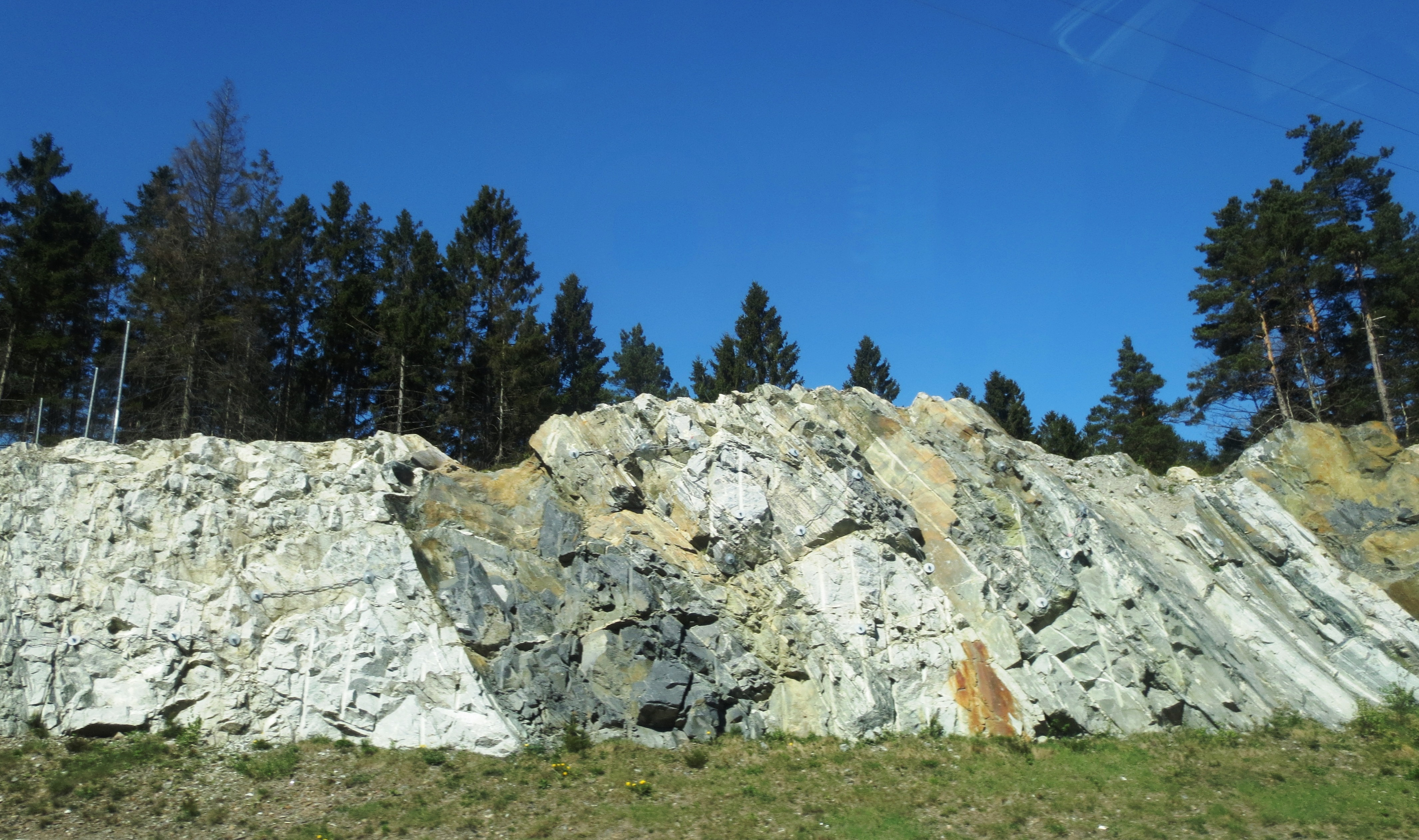
A tonalite-trondhjemite and gneiss outcrop in Grimstad, Norway. TTG is a prevalent rock type in archean formations.

All three regions contain an abundance of Archean felsic volcanic rocks, including tonalite, trondhjemite and granodiorite (TTG) series rocks, with minor granulite to amphibolite facies gneiss complexes, which means that the original characters of the rocks has been disturbed by at least one ductile deformation at deep crustal conditions.

Eoarchean geology is important in investigating Earth's tectonic history. It is because the planet had just undergone a transformation to the present-day-similar convective mode and lithosphere from a magma ocean in Hadean Eon, to either a protoplate tectonics or an unstable stagnant lithosphere lid at its infant stages. The earth's condition during Archean to Proterozoic (including Eoarchean era) serves as a crucial linkage between Hadean magma ocean to present-day plate tectonics. Various interpretations have been suggested to explain the prevalent tectonic style corresponding to Eoarchean geology. However it can be, in general, classified into two tectonic models, which are vertical tectonics and plate tectonics.

Explanation of the release of large amount of mantle heat is the prominent concern. Most of the evidences shows a probability that pre-plate tectonics dominantly involved intense surface volcanism, active magmatism and crustal recycling.

== Occurrence of Eoarchean rocks ==
Eoarchean geology is dominated by:

1. Mafic to ultramafic volcanics
2. Tonalite-trondhjemite-granodiorite (TTG)
3. Chemical sedimentary rocks such as chert and Banded-Iron-Formations (BIF)
4. Subordinate clastic sedimentary rocks.

Distribution of Preserved Eoarchean rocks on earth crust
Name	Age of the formation	Location	Dominant rock type	Remarks
Acasta Gneisses	4.03 Ga to 3.96 Ga	Slave Craton in Northwest Canada	Highly deformed TTG, with interleaving amphibolite, ultramafic rocks and pink granites	
Napier Complex	3.95 Ga to 3.8 Ga	Enderby Land, Antarctica	TTG, which has sedimentary protoliths	
Itsaq Gneiss Complex	Akulleq terrance at 3.9 Ga to 3.8 Ga	Southwest Greenland	Amitsoq TTG complex	The largest and best-preserved fragment of Eoarchean continental crust
Saglek-Hebron block	3.86 Ga to 3.73 Ga	East coast of Labrador	supracrustal assemblage in Nulliak unit; Gneiss in Uivak units	The region is divided into three regions; they are Nulliak, Uivak I and Uivak II
Nuvvuagittuq Supracrustal Belt	about 3.8 Ga	Superior Province, Quebec	Two greenstone assemblage successions (1) Conglomerate, Garnet paragneisses, chemical sedimentary rocks (2) Volcanic rocks, mafic to intermediate tuff and chemical sedimentary rocks	

There are some zircons dated back to the Eoarchean, but this does not necessarily indicate the host rock was formed in the Eoarchean, in

(1) Anshan Area in North China Craton

(2) Sebakwe Protocraton in Zimbabwe Craton

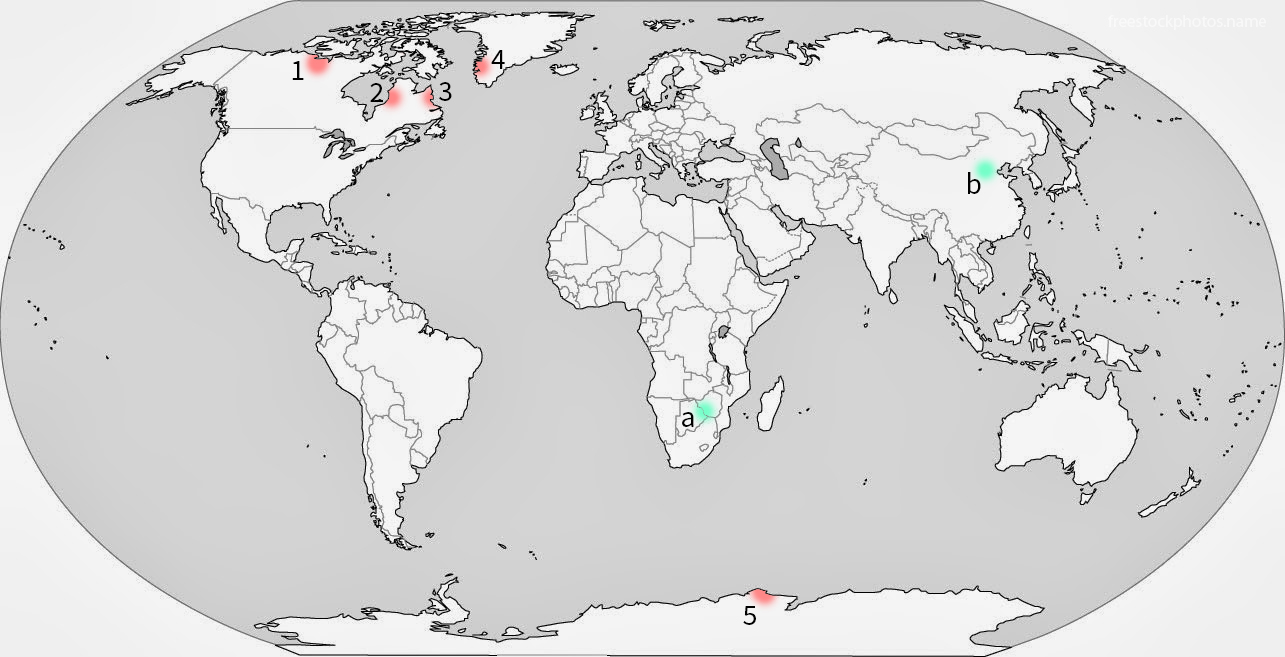
World Map showing the location of the most prominent well-preserved Eoarchean geology 1.Acasta Gneiss 2.Nuvvuagittuq Greenstone Belt 3.Saglek-Hebron Block 4.Itsaq Gneiss Complex 5.Napier Complex a.Sebakwe protocraton b.Anshan

== Isua Supracrustal Belt and the Isua Area ==
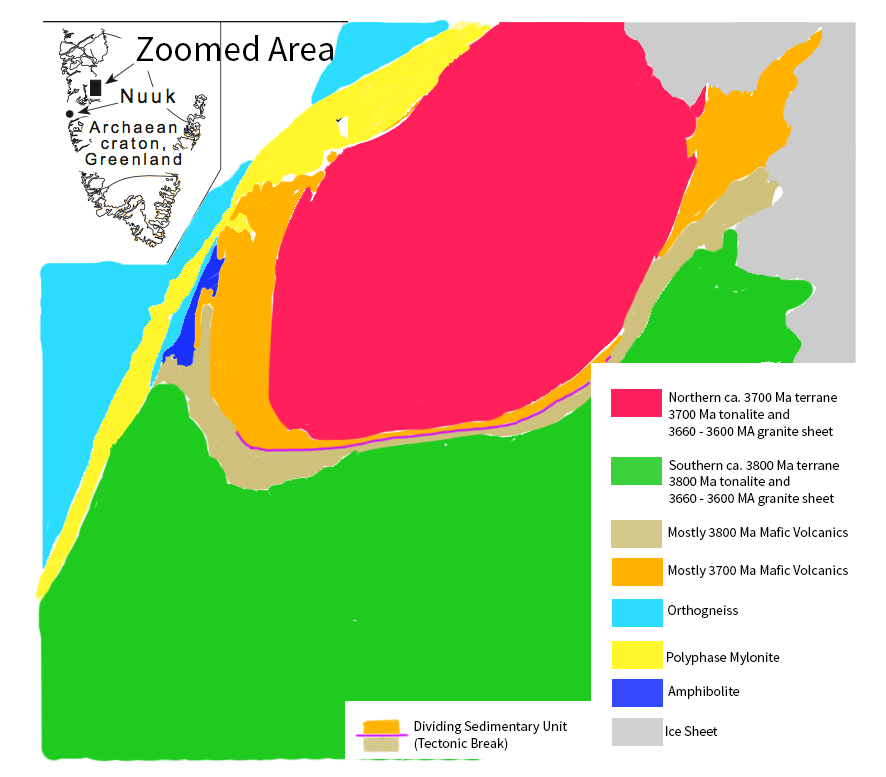
Map of Isua Area. Between the 3.7 Ga region (Marked in red) and the 3.8 Ga region (Marked in Green) is the Isua Supracrustal Belt. It is located near Nuuk in Greenland (Inspired by Nutman et al., 2009, Modified for use)

The Isua Greenstone Belt, also known as the Isua supracrustal belt, is found at the Isukasia terrane in Southern West Greenland and hosts the oldest and well-preserved sedimentary and volcanic rocks dated between 3.7 and 3.8 billion years old. The 35-km long, 4 km wide greenstone belt had been deformed into a thin U-shape pointing to the Southwest direction with an approximate diameter of 25 km. It consists mainly of amphibolite metamorphosed from basalt, with chemical rocks, felsic units and ultra mafic units. The upper amphibolite metamorphic grade of these rocks, with local retrogressions, has stabilised (black) hornblende; these rocks are not "greenstones" because they experienced metamorphism well beyond greenschist facies. Nevertheless, the term "Isua Greenstone Belt" lingers on in the literature.

The Isua Supracrustal Belt (ISB) is part of the Itsaq Gneiss Complex, in which most of the lithology are orthogneiss. Local orthogneisses were previously named after Amîtsoq Gneiss. Geologists often regionally divide the entire Isua Area into two parts along the ISB. The core of the U-shaped Isua belt, or the "northern gneisses", are mostly tonalite to granitic rock, while the south to the belt or the "southern gneisses" are similar granitoid rocks. Contacts between the ISB and the gneisses are in general strongly deformed and myloitic.

The tectonic style responsible for the Isua area is still controversial. Either vertical plate tectonics or proto-plate tectonics with subduction is viable. Geologists who are proto-plate tectonic advocates often divide the Isua area into northern and southern terranes by the average dated age from the gneiss in each terrane. Between these two chronologically different regions, a thin sedimentary unit lying in the Isua Supracrustal Belt is the dividing boundary. These two terranes were juxtaposed and assembled between either 3680 to 3660 Ma or 3650 to 3600 Ma.

=== Lithologies ===
The Isua Supracrustal Belt was mostly deformed during the Eoarchean. In many areas, primary volcanic and sedimentary structures were obliterated. However, in rare low strain areas, the original protolith structure is still visible. The major lithologies in the Isua belt are (1) tonalites of the Itsaq/Amîtsoq gneiss, (2) Basaltic pillow lava and pillow breccia, and (3) Banded Iron formations.

Presence of the above lithologies enables study of the paleo-environment:

1. paragneisses sometimes show graded felsic clast units, which means a derivation from felsic volcanic or felsic volcano-sedimentary rock.
2. Presence of pillow-structured lava and breccia indicates that there was liquid water in the eoarchean.
3. Banded Iron Formations (BIF), with a minor metachert unit, is an indicator for coeval deposition of aqueous clastic and chemical sediment.

A Subsequent U-Pb zircon-dating program demonstrated that the belt contains supracrustal rocks ranging in age from 3.8 to 3.7 billion years ago, having only a ~100 million year variation of age within the belt. 3.8 billion year old rocks are predominantly concentrated at the southern part of the belt while the 3.7 billion old counterpart are located at the centre and northern part. The sequence experienced three isolated phases of metamorphism, at least one of them in the early Archean. It is argued this highly developed metamorphic history precludes assignment of these rocks as "greenstones".

Similar looking Itsaq Gneiss bounds the Isua belt from North and from the South.

==== North of the Isua Supracrustal Belt ====
To the north, the Isua supracrustal belt is bounded by orthogneisses. Dominant tonalitic gneisses show a protolith age of about 3.7 billion years. A low strain area of several square kilometres is observed in the northeast part of the Isua Belt. Dominant phases are foliated metatonalites, with additional 3660 Ma diorite and 3655 to 3640 Ma granite and pegmatite. Measured ages from the tonalites in the northern terrane are between 3720 and 3690 Ma, which is 100 million years younger than those in the southern region.

==== South of the Isua Supracrustal Belt ====
The Southern region is mostly composed of a comparable orthogneiss to the northern region. However, the ages yielded from the protoliths are between 3872 and 3700 Ma. The ages of the rock are generally 100 million years older than that in the northern terrane.

Amphibolites showing localised pillow structure reflects a submarine basaltic environment in the past. Zircon overgrowth indicates an event of high-grade metamorphism between 3660 and 3650 Ma.

=== Tectonics ===
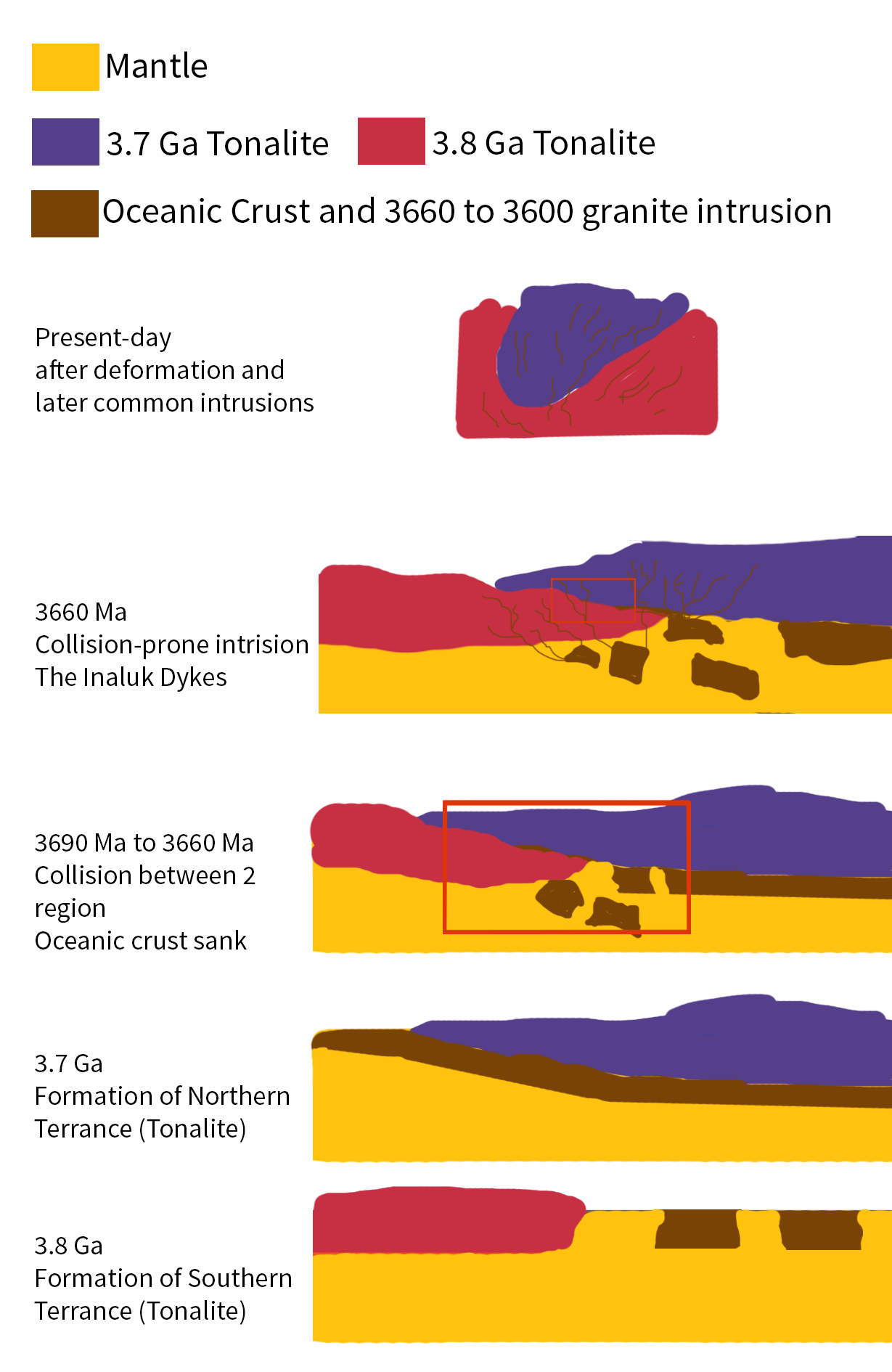
Proto-plate tectonics in the Isua area in the Eoarchean – this sequence covers the collision of the 3.8 Ga region to the 3.7 Ga region between 3690 Ma to 3660 Ma. Inspired by Nutman et al., 2009. Modified for use

==== Subduction and lateral proto-plate tectonics ====
The Isua Greenstone Belt is currently under heavy investigation as it provides a unique opportunity to study early earth's tectonics. There is no single widely accepted tectonic explanation for the formation of the Isua supracrustal belt and the adjacent area, although some viable models have been proposed. One of the suggested explanations is proto-plate tectonics, with a convergent plate margin environment.

A 3660 Ma to 3690 Ma collision can be speculated to have occurred between the northern 3.7 Ga region and the 3.8 Ga region, along a thin layer of sedimentary dividing unit in the Isua Greenstone belt.

Both terranes shows episodic deposition of volcanic tonalite-trondhjemite-granodiorite (TTG). These TTGs are between 3720 and 3710 Ma old, with the composition of these relatively juvenile igneous rocks showing that it is sourced from partial melting of eclogitized mafic material, with high magnesium but low silica content. This can be explained by the partial melting of a subducted slab, which would mean the environment was comparable to a convergent plate boundary or a subduction zone setting.

A thin metasedimentary unit derived mainly from banded iron formations, chert and carbonate rocks is believed to be the dividing unit between the 3.8 Ga region and 3.7 Ga region. In some well-exposed area, highly tectonized and recrystallised mylonites are present.

Collision of the old and new block happened between 3690 Ma and 3660 Ma, since 3690 Ma was the age yielded from the youngest tonalite, which is only found in the Northern terrane. This can be interpreted as indicative of a much further distance between the northern region and the southern region at 3690 Ma than we see today. 3660 Ma is the age measured from the ultramafic-to-dioritic Inaluk dykes, which is a common intrusion in both terrane. This potentially brackets the time of collision between these two intrusive events.

==== Alternative tectonic model: vertical tectonics ====
As plumes and impact structures are observed in Isua area, it is postulated that "vertical tectonics" are also a viable method to reconstruct the Eoarchean Isua Area. In addition, the material found in lateral transport thrusts has been recorded from both plume-related volcanic centers and in impact centres. This hypothesis however currently lacks crucial evidence for vertical tectonics, such as dome-and-syncline regional diapirs.

== Acasta Gneiss Complex ==
The Acasta Gneiss Complex is located in the western part of the Slave Province, and is well exposed along the Acasta river. The Acasta Gnessis Complex contains the oldest known felsic rocks on Earth, with ages up to 4.02 Ga but have rocks as young as 2.95 Ga. It is part of the Slave Province which covers an area approximately 190,000 km^{2}. After the initial documentation of very ancient zircons present in the Acasta River area, a significant scientific debate regarding the true age of these important rocks was born. Some geologists suggested that all rocks in the Acasta region were highly metamorphosed and altered 3.3 billion years ago, so that their zircon ages were not reflective of the true ages of the rocks. This debate culminated in a series of papers and comments regarding the discrepancy between zircon age information and whole-rock data. The age debate has been mostly resolved by further work in the Acasta area by several research groups as well as the general acceptance by the scientific community of using in situ zircon U-Pb to obtain ages from complicated rocks. Although complicated rocks, with multiple age domains mixed together, do certainly exist in the Acasta region, much simpler rocks are definitively present as well so the entire Complex was clearly not wholesale overprinted by 3.3 Ga metamorphism. The oldest known rock unit in the Acasta region is a 4.02 Ga tonalitic unit termed the Idiwhaa Tonalitic Gneiss.

Notably, one xenocrystic zircon core, which was included in a 3.92 Ga gneiss, has been dated to 4.2 Ga, which is the oldest age recorded in the Acasta area. However, the rock that originally grew this zircon has not been found, and it may not even exist anymore. The ages of rocks in the Acasta Gneiss Complex have peaks at 3.92-4.02 Ga, 3.75 Ga, 3.6 Ga, and 3.4 Ga which document major crust forming events.

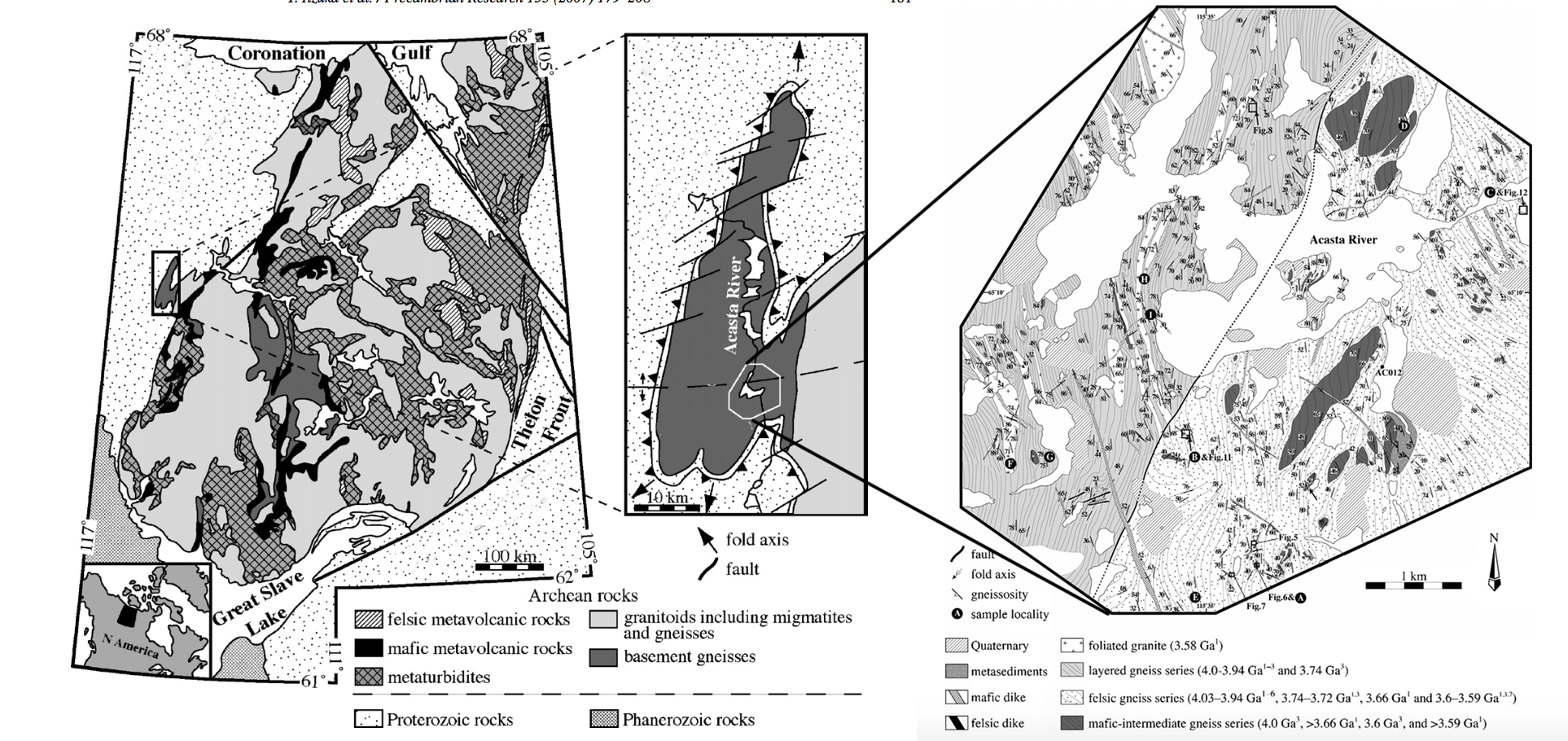
Map of Acasta Gneiss Complex. Adopted and modified from Koshida et al., 2016

=== Lithologies ===
Dominant rocks in the region are variably deformed tonalitic, granodioritic, and granitic, and amphibolitic gneisses. Mafic rocks such as amphibolite and ultramafic rocks are also present in the Acasta Gneiss Complex and occur in variable proportions throughout the Complex. A north-east trending fault divides the area into two domains.

==== Eastern domain ====
The eastern area has an abundance of relatively massive tonalitic, granodioritic and granitic gneiss and gabbroic, dioritic and quartz-dioritic gneisses are present. Four episodes of tonalite-granite emplacement shows ages of 3.94–4.02, 3.74, 3.66 and 3.59 Ga.

==== Western Domain ====
The western area is dominated by layered quartz dioritic to dioritic, tonalitic to granitic gneiss and young foliated granitic intrusions. It shows a formation of the granitic protolith of the layered gneiss at 3.97 Ga, followed by a 3.58 Gyr old granitic intrusion, which has been foliated.

==== Mafic enclaves and inclusions ====
Mafic rocks are distributed within the entire Acasta Gneiss Complex as minor blocks such as enclaves and bands. The mafic rocks consist of massive to slightly foliated amphibolite, garnet amphibolite as well as hornblendite. Mineral composition indicates that they had experienced metamorphism between amphibolite to upper amphibolite facies.

=== Tectonics ===
Though there is no well-accepted tectonic setting that formed the Acasta Gneiss Complex, various hypotheses have been proposed. First, the oldest rocks in the Acasta region, the Idiwhaa Tonalitic Gneiss, shows a distinctive geochemistry of high Fe but low Mg content, and a relatively flat REE pattern. Compositions like this occur in very few locations on the modern Earth, including modern Iceland. This led to the idea that the earliest phase of crust formation in the Acasta region occurred by petrologic processes similar to modern Iceland, that is, shallow intrusion of dry basalts and partial melting at low pressures. Something changed at 3.6 Ga however, as the rocks formed in the Acasta Gneiss Complex have very different geochemical signatures at this time. This led to proposals for a subduction-like setting, or mobile-lid setting, at 3.6 Ga in the Acasta area. Other authors, using the Thorium-to-niobium ratio in the amphibolites, suggested that subduction occurred much earlier, closer to 4.0 Ga.

== Nuvvuagittuq Greenstone Belt and adjacent TTG ==
The Nuvvuagittuq Greenstone Belt (NGB) is located in Northern Quebec, covering approximately 8 km^{2} of the Hudson Bay. It resembles a north-closing synform that plunges towards the south.

The true age of the NGB is debated. Some argue that it is between 4.4 Ga and 3.8 Ga old. The 4.4-Ga-old ages for cummingtonite-amphibolites in NGB do not, by their low isotopic ratio of 142-Neodymium to 144-Neodymium, represent that the mafic host rock is also of Hadean age. Significantly, the oldest detrital zircon with high correspondence to the host rock yielded an age of 3780 Ma that is argued to define the maximum age of these rocks.

=== Lithologies ===
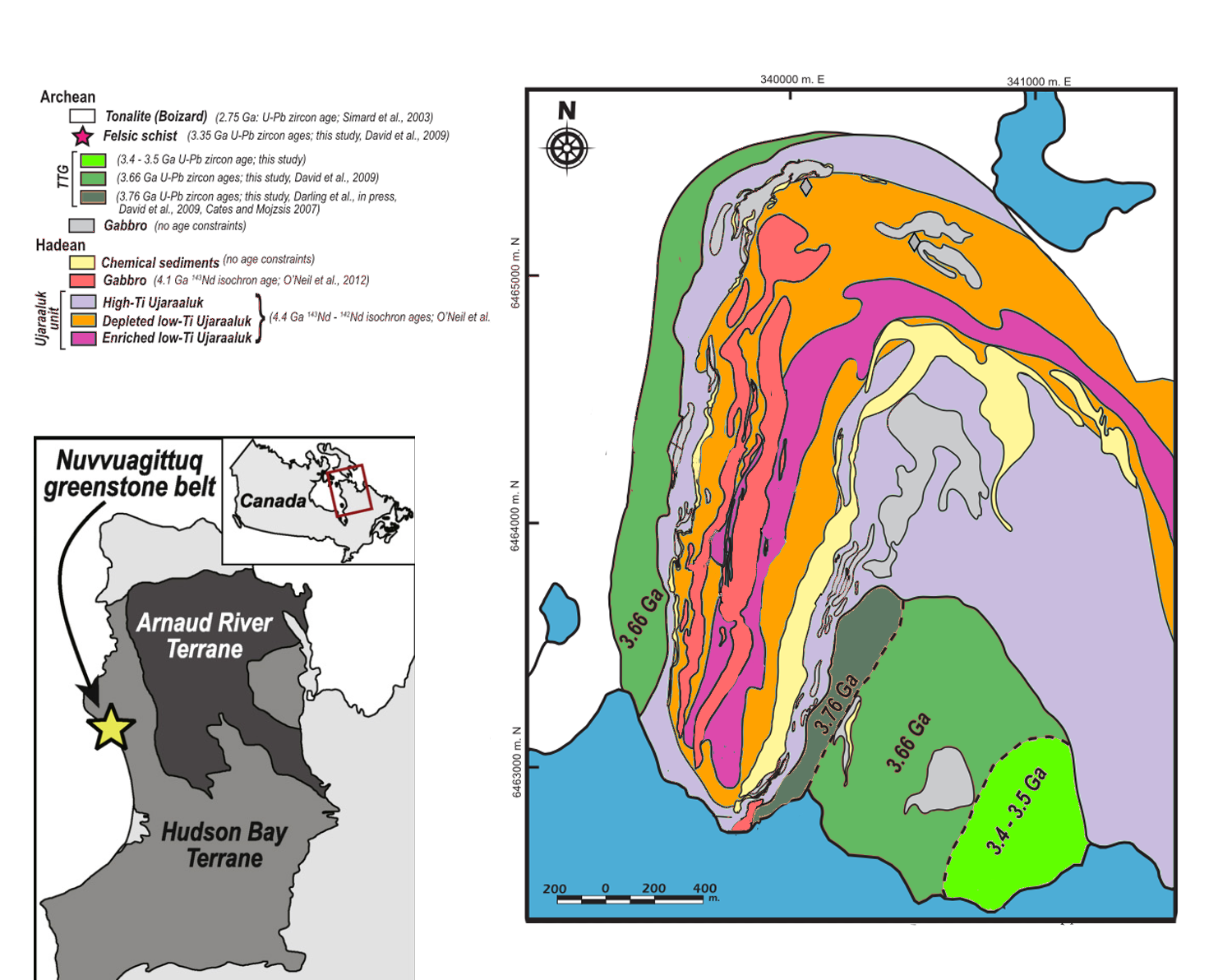
An Overview Map of the Nuvvuagituq Greenstone Belt and its adjacent TTGs. Inspired by and modified from O'Neil et al., 2012 and O'Neil et al. 2013.

The Nuvvuagituq Greenstone Belt is divided into three lithological units:

The Ujaraaluk unit is an amphibolite enriched in cummingtonite, plagioclase and biotite, and depleted in hornblende, Gabbroic and ultramafic intrusive bodies, and a chemical sedimentary protolith, i.e. banded iron formations (BIF) and banded silicate formations (BSF).

Within the largest unit, the cummingtonite amphibolite, a progression of garnet content and a regression of chlorite and epidote from west to east shows an intensification of metamorphism of amphibolite from green-schist facies to an upper-amphibolite facies.

==== Surrounding tonalites, trondhjemites and granodiorites ====
The Nuvvuagituq Belt is bounded by Eoarchean tonalites, trondhjemites and granodiorite aged around 3660 Ma, and further surrounded by younger approximately 2750 Ma tonalities. Surrounding tonalites, trondhjemites and granodiorites (TTGs) are the product of partial melting of Hadean Mafic lithologies, which was similar to the informally-named Ujaraaluk unit. The remelt products of Hadean Ujaraaluk and the exposed, eoarhcean cummingtonite amphibolite unit share a similar geochemical composition, i.e. isotopic ratio of 142-Neodymiun and 144-Neodymium, which suggests that these isotopic ratios can be inherited from one generation of melt to another. The TTG-Felsic crusts formed in multiple episodes. By U-Pb zircon geochronology, the fourfold episodic TTGs were dated to be 3.76 Ga, 3.66 Ga, 3.5–3.4 Ga and 3.35 Ga in age.

=== Tectonics ===
==== Proto-plate tectonics ====
Crustal recycling produced the TTGs surrounding the Nuvvuagituq Belt from arc-like source rocks, i.e. the Ujaraaluk Unit. A large scale simultaneous accumulation of TTGs and subsequent partial melting only occurs in particular tectonic settings. It is speculated that their origin is related to crustal recycling in which the mafic crust and water were returned to the mantle, and as a consequence, arc-like mafic magma formed. This resembles a subduction system in modern plate tectonics, but the geologic evidence is still insufficient to draw direct parallels.
