= Amalgamation =

Amalgamation is the process of combining or uniting multiple entities into one form.

Amalgamation, amalgam, and other derivatives may refer to:

== Mathematics and science ==
- Amalgam (chemistry), the combination of mercury with another metal
  - Pan amalgamation, another extraction method with additional compound
  - Patio process, the use of mercury amalgamation to extract silver
- Amalgamation (geology), the creation of a stable continent or craton by the union of two terranes; see Tectonic evolution of the Barberton greenstone belt
- Amalgamation paradox in probability and statistics, also known as Simpson's paradox
- Amalgamation property in model theory
- Free product with amalgamation, in mathematics, especially group theory, an important construction

== Arts, entertainment, and media ==
- Amalgamated Broadcasting System, a short-lived American radio network during the 1930s
- Amalgamation (fiction), the concept of creating an element in a work of fiction by combining existing things
- Amalgamation, a 1994 EP by the band Pop Will Eat Itself
- Amalgamation, the debut studio album by the band Trapt

== Other uses ==
- Amalgamated (1917 automobile), car manufactured by the Amalgamated Machinery Corp.
- Amalgamated (organization name)
- Amalgamation (business), the merge or consolidation of companies
- Amalgamation (land), the formal combination of adjoining plots; in some jurisdictions distinct from a merger
- Amalgamation (names), the strategy of naming something after a combination of existing names
- Amalgamation (race), a now largely archaic term for the merger of people of different ethnicities and "races"
- Amalgamation, another name for a trade union, chiefly used in the UK
- Amalgamation, in C (programming language) (C) and C++ programming, merging all the source codes of a library into a single header file
- Conflation, also known as "idiom amalgamation", the combination of two expressions
- Merger (politics), consolidation or amalgamation, in geopolitics, joining two or more political or administrative entities, such as municipalities, cities, towns, counties, districts etc. into a single entity
- Amalgamation (military), the merger of two or more regiments or other units to form a single unit, usually continuing the history and traditions of all of its predecessors.

== See also ==
- Amalgam (disambiguation)
