= Agalma =

An agalma (Ancient Greek: άγαλμα, lit. 'statue') is a cult image or votive offering.

Agalma may also refer to:

- Agalma (cnidarian), a marine animal genus in the family Agalmatidae
- Agalma, a synonym of the flowering plant genus Heptapleurum
- Agalma (journal) (est. 2000), an academic journal devoted to the study of culture and aesthetics

== See also ==
- Alma (disambiguation)
- Alms, charity given to the poor; a false cognate of the word agalma
- Amalgam (disambiguation)
