= Dawu =

Dawu or DAWU may refer to:

== Dominica ==
- Dominica Amalgamated Workers' Union

== Ghana ==
- Dawu (Ghana), a town in the Eastern Region
- Dawu Sports Stadium, located in Accra, Ghana

== Mainland China ==
- Dawu County, Hubei (大悟县), of Xiaogan, Hubei
- Dawu County, Sichuan, or Daofu County (道孚县) from its pinyin name, of Garzê Tibetan Autonomous Prefecture, Sichuan

=== Towns ===
- Dawu, Xuzhou (大吴镇), in Jiawang District, Xuzhou, Jiangsu
- Dawu, Tengzhou (大坞镇), in Tengzhou City, Shandong

Written as "大武镇":

- Dawu, Fangshan County, in Fangshan County, Shanxi
- Dawu Town, Maqên County, in Maqên County, Qinghai

=== Townships ===
- Dawu Township, Zhecheng County (大仵乡), in Zhecheng County, Henan

Written as "大武乡":

- Dawu Township, Shangshui County, in Shangshui County, Henan
- Dawu Township, Maqên County, town in Maqên County, Qinghai
- Dawu, Dongkou (大屋瑶族乡), a Yao ethnic township of Dongkou County, Hunan

== Taiwan ==
- Dawu, Taitung (大武鄉), township in Taitung County
