= Eoarchean =

First era of the Archean Eon

- 4031 ± 3 – 3600 Ma

Chronology
Vertical axis scale: Millions of years ago

Etymology
- Name formality: Formal
- Alternate spelling(s): Eoarchaean

Usage information
- Celestial body: Earth
- Regional usage: Global (ICS)
- Time scale(s) used: ICS Time Scale

Definition
- Chronological unit: Era
- Stratigraphic unit: Erathem
- Time span formality: Formal
- Lower boundary definition: Ten oldest U-Pb zircon ages
- Lower boundary GSSA: Along the Acasta River, Northwest Territories, Canada; 65.1738°N 115.5538°W
- Lower GSSA ratified: 2023
- Upper boundary definition: Defined Chronometrically
- Upper GSSA ratified: Not formally defined

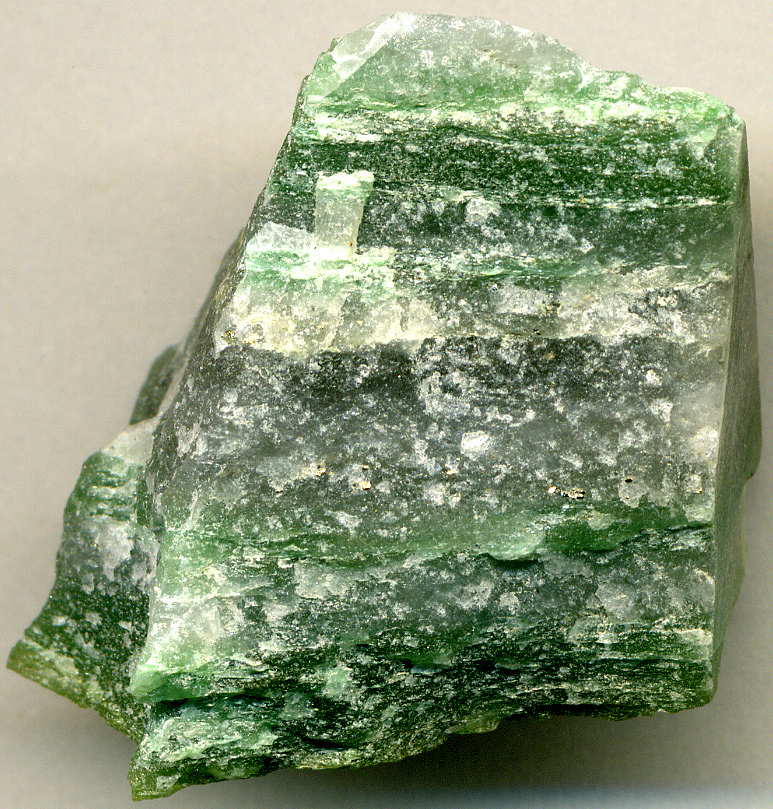
Eoarchaean (3.8 b.y.) Greenlandite specimen (fuchsite-quartz gneiss), Nuup Kangerlua, Greenland.

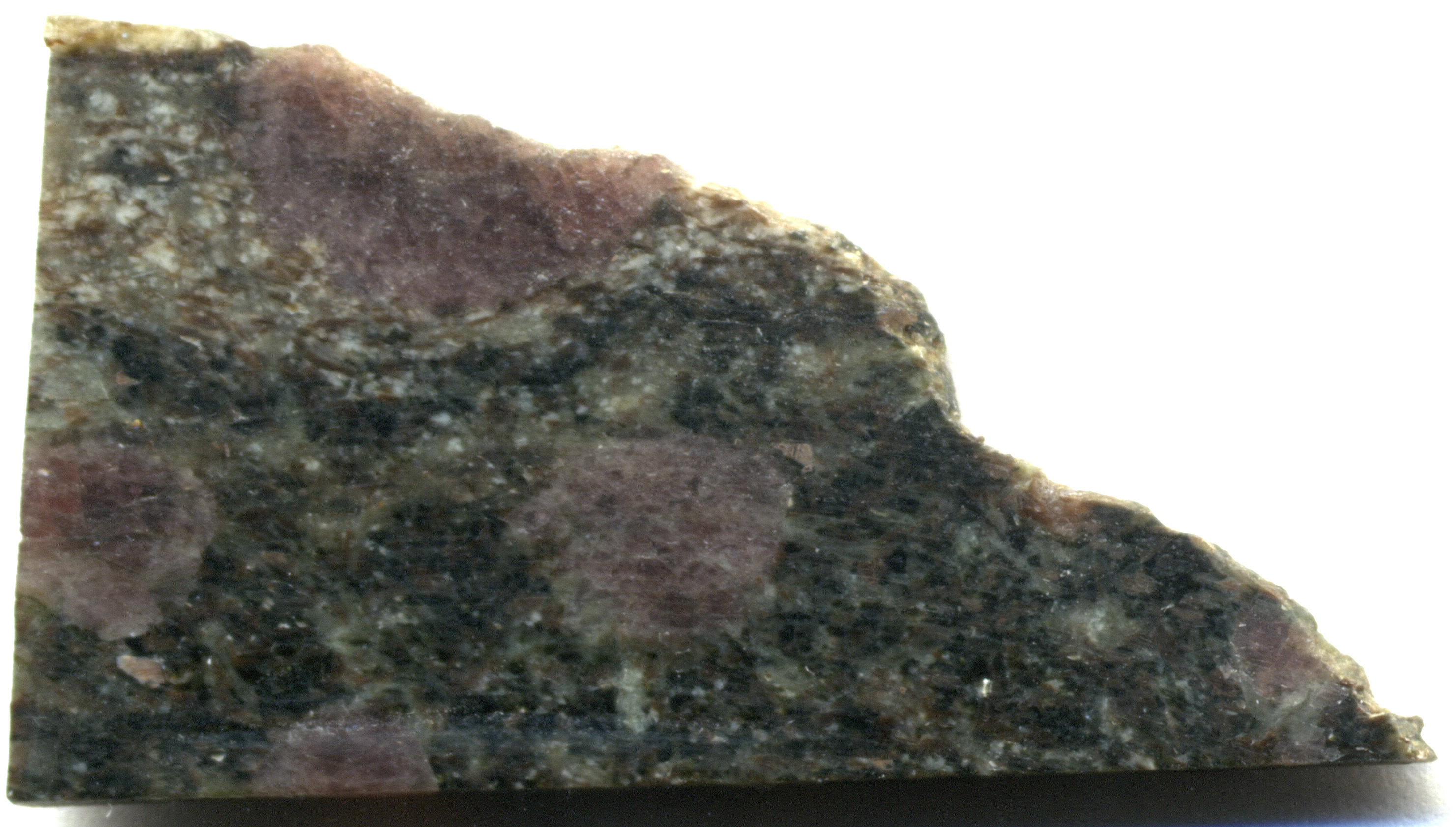
Garnet paragneiss, Nuvvuagittuq Greenstone Belt, Canada. 4.28 Ga old: the oldest known Earth rock of which direct samples are available.

The Eoarchean (IPA: /ˌiːoʊ.ɑːrˈkiːən/ EE-oh-ar-KEE-ən; also spelled Eoarchaean) is the first era of the Archean Eon of the geologic record. It spans 431 million years, from the end of the Hadean Eon 4031 Mya to the start of the Paleoarchean Era 3600 Mya. Some estimates place the beginnings of life on Earth in this era, while others place it earlier. Evidence of archaea and cyanobacteria date to 3500 Mya, which is shortly after the Eoarchean. At that time, the atmosphere was without oxygen and the pressure values ranged from 10 to 100 bar (around 10 to 100 times the atmospheric pressure today).

== Etymology ==
The name comes from two Ancient Greek words: eos (dawn) and archaios (ancient).

== Chronology ==
The Eoarchean Era was formerly officially unnamed and informally referred to as the first part of the Early Archean Eon alongside the Paleoarchean Era. The International Commission on Stratigraphy now officially recognizes the Eoarchean Era as the first part of the Archaean Eon, preceded by the Hadean Eon, during which the Earth is believed to have been essentially molten.

The Eoarchaean's lower boundary or starting point of 4.031 Gya (4031 million years ago) is officially recognized by the International Commission on Stratigraphy. The first supercontinent candidate Vaalbara appeared around the end of this period at about 3,600 million years ago.

== Geology ==
The beginning of the Eoarchean is characterized by heavy asteroid bombardment within the Inner Solar System: the Late Heavy Bombardment. The largest Eoarchean rock formation is the Isua Greenstone Belt on the south-west coast of Greenland, which dates from 3.8 billion years. The Acasta Gneiss within the Canadian Shield have been dated to be 4,031 Ma and are therefore the oldest preserved rock formations. In 2008, another rock formation was discovered in the Nuvvuagittuq Greenstone Belt in northern Québec, Canada, which has been dated to be 4,280 million years ago. These formations are presently under intense investigation. Oxygen isotope ratios show that the hydrological cycle had begun by the early Eoarchean and possibly earlier. Carbonate precipitation (caused by heating of seawater by hydrothermal vents) acted as an important sink regulating the concentration of carbon dioxide in the atmosphere during this era.

== Atmosphere ==
3,850 million years old apatite from Greenland shows evidence of Carbon-12 enrichment. This has sparked a debate whether there might have been photosynthetic life before 3.8 billion years ago.
