= Volcano-sedimentary =

Volcano-sedimentary may refer to:

- Volcano-sedimentary rock, a sedimentary rock originating from volcanic material
- Volcano-sedimentary sequence, a stratigraphic sequence formed from a combination of volcanic and sedimentary events
