= Acasta Gneiss =

Metamorphic rock unit in Canada

Coordinates: 65°09′59.91″N 115°34′54″W

Acasta Gneiss Complex
- Stratigraphic range: Archean; ~4020–2940 Ma
- Type: Complex
- Sub-units: Idiwhaa tonalitic gneiss
- Underlies: Central Slave Cover Group
- Area: > 13,000 km^{2} (5,000 mi^{2})
- Thickness: unknown

Lithology
- Primary: tonalitic and granodioritic orthogneisses
- Other: mafic and ultramafic gneisses

Location
- Region: Slave craton, Northwest Territories
- Country: Canada

Type section
- Named for: Acasta River
- Named by: J. E. King
- Year defined: 1985

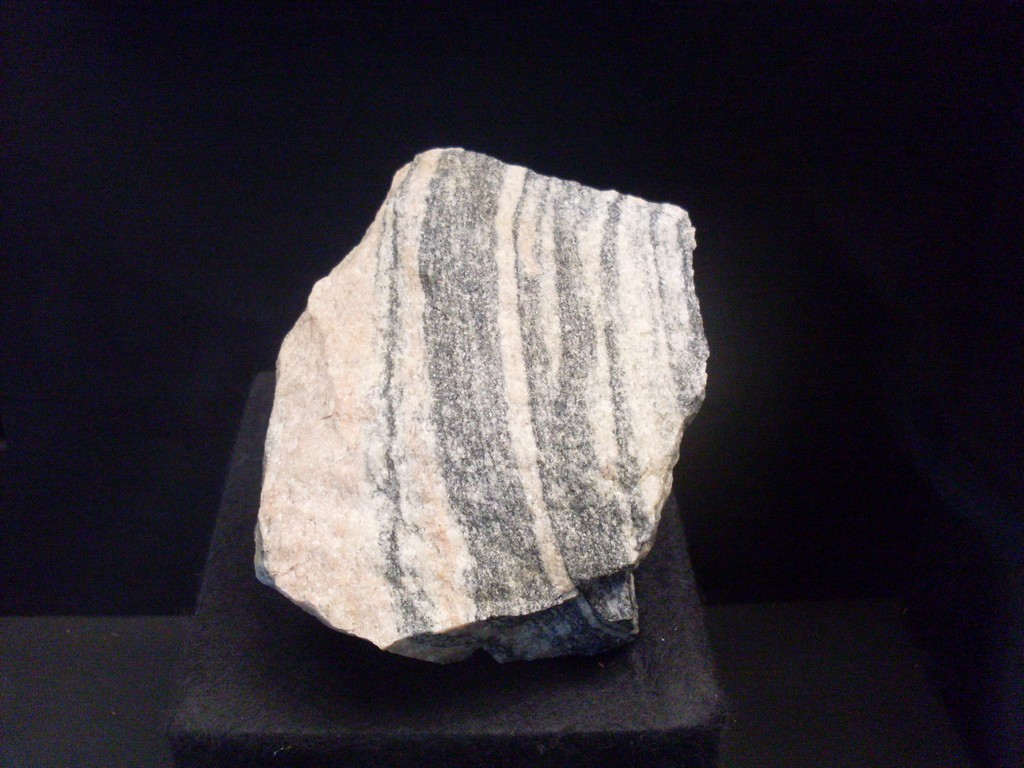
Fragment of felsic Acasta Gneiss Complex exhibited at the Natural History Museum in Vienna

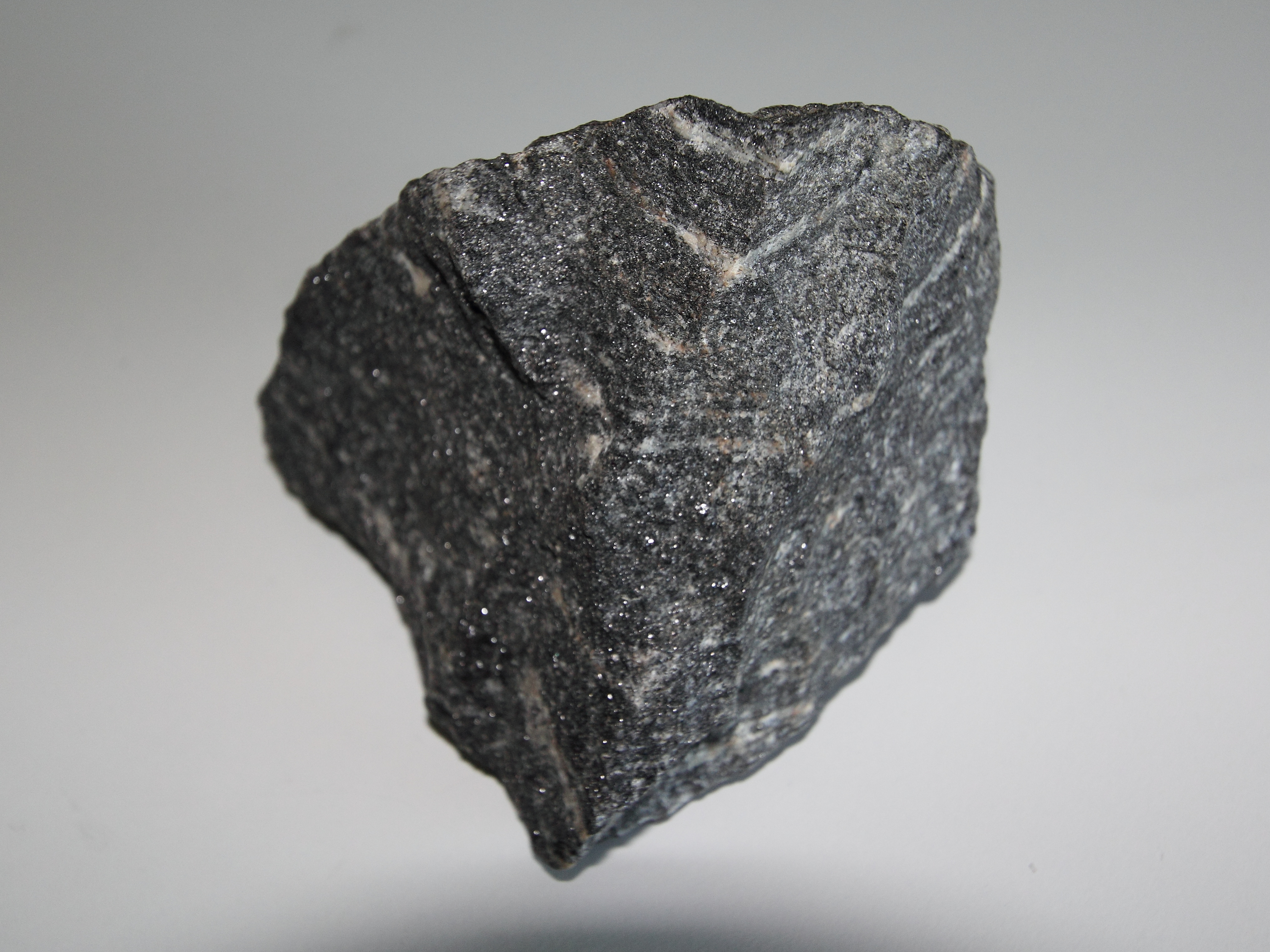
Fragment of mafic Acasta Gneiss Complex (Collection: H. Martin, Blaise Pascal University)

The Acasta Gneiss Complex, also called the Acasta Gneiss, is a body of felsic to ultramafic Archean basement rocks, gneisses, that form the northwestern edge of the Slave Craton in the Northwest Territories, Canada, about 300 km (190 mi) north of Yellowknife, Canada. This geologic complex consists largely of tonalitic and granodioritic gneisses and lesser amounts of mafic and ultramafic gneisses. It underlies and is largely concealed by thin, patchy cover of Quaternary glacial sediments over an area of about 13,000 km^{2} (5,000 mi^{2}). The Acasta Gneiss Complex contains fragments of the oldest known crust and record of more than a billion years (>4.0–2.9 Ga) of magmatism and metamorphism. The Acasta Gneiss Complex is exposed in a set of anticlinoriums within the foreland fold and thrust belt of the Paleoproterozoic Wopmay Orogen.

== Nomenclature ==
The gneisses of the Acasta Gneiss Complex were first regionally mapped during a mapping program carried out by the Geological Survey of Canada. These gneisses were informally named the Acasta gneiss complex for the Acasta River east of Great Bear Lake in 1985 by J. E. King. Later, it was referred to as the Acasta gneisses by S.A. Bowring and others in 1989 In subsequent publications, Acasta Gneiss Complex is used instead of Acasta gneisses.

As the result of a detailed mapping and U–Pb dating, the oldest zircons of the Acasta Gneiss Complex were found to occur within a relatively homogeneous and mappable tonalitic gneiss by J. R. Reimink and others in 2014. They named it the Idiwhaa tonalitic gneiss. The Idiwhaa tonalitic gneiss has yielded abundant well-preserved igneous zircons with a U–Pb crystallization age of 4.02 Ga. It is a relatively homogeneous mafic tonalite that consists primarily of plagioclase, quartz, hornblende, biotite and minor garnet, with small, cross-cutting felsic veins.

== Lithology ==
The Acasta Gneiss Complex is a heterogeneous assemblage of foliated to gneissic tonalites, trondhjemites, granodiorites, and granites which contains minor quartz-diorites, diorites, gabbros, and ultramafic rocks. Of the 13,000 km^{2} (5,000 mi^{2}) of the Canadian Shield underlain by Acasta Gneiss, only a 50 km^{2} (19 mi^{2}) area has been mapped and studied in great detail. This is because of the area's remoteness and patchy outcrops due to a thick cover of Pleistocene glacial deposits. The study of the age distribution of detrital zircons from the Pleistocene deposits inferred the unmapped Acasta Gneiss Complex covered by Pleistocene deposits consists of a significant volume of 3.37 Ga granitoids. This study also concluded that near its inferred eastern limit, the unmapped Acasta Gneiss Complex contain rocks at least as old as 3.95 Ga.

== Contacts ==
The base of Acasta Gneiss Complex is unexposed and unknown. It is considered to be unconformibly overlain by Central Slave Cover Group. The base of younger Late Mesoarchean greenstone belts that comprise the Central Slave Cover Group consists largely of fuchsite-bearing quartz arenite. These quartz arenites are associated with chert-magnetite iron formation, rhyolite, and locally some ultrabasic rocks. These strata are interpreted to be remnants of the earliest sedimentary and volcanic strata that accumulated on the Mesoarchean crystalline basement of the Slave craton.

== Origin ==
From decades of petrologic, geochronologic, and geochemical studies, it has become apparent that the Acasta Gneiss Complex, as it is now exposed in the Canadian Shield, is the result of the complex interplay between repeated periods of felsic magma generation from the partial melting of older, mafic crust, its crystallization as felsic plutonic rocks, and subsequent thermal metamorphism. The formation of the Acasta Gneiss Complex began at the end of the Hadean and continued episodically over much of the Archean. The oldest felsic rocks that are currently exposed intruded pre-existing, even older, mafic crustal rock and crystallized well beneath the Earth's surface. Later, these rocks were thermally metamorphosed, intruded by additional felsic magma, and partially melted during Eoarchean thermal events occurred about 3.85 to 3.72 Ga and 3.66 to 3.59 Ga. The metamorphism and intrusion by felsic magmas continued throughout the Archean. This included major periods of intrusion by granitic magmas about 3.30 Ga, 2.88 Ga, and 2.70 Ga. Finally, these rocks were intruded by multiple Paleoproterozoic dike swarms and syenites about 1.80 Ga. The setting in which the tectonic activity that created the Acasta Gneiss Complex is proposed to have been a block of dominantly mafic protocrust, at least some of which crystallized in the Hadean. This block of protocrust would have been very similar to modern Iceland in its geology.

== Earth’s oldest rock ==
With zircon U-Pb crystallization ages as old as about 4.03 Ga, beds within the Acasta Gneiss Complex are, as of 2026, regarded to be the oldest known felsic rocks (crust) on Earth. Based on the analyses of Sm and Nd isotopes, mafic rocks of the Nuvvuagittuq Greenstone Belt, found on the shore of Hudson Bay, Inukjuak, Quebec, are argued to be the oldest rocks (crust) on Earth with estimated crystallization age of 4.313 Ga. Unfortunately, because of the basaltic composition and low-Zr content of the rocks comprising Nuvvuagittuq Greenstone Belt, they essentially lack the igneous zircons needed to reliably date them. As a result, their age and status as oldest known rock on Earth remains controversial. U-Pb crystallization ages of igneous zircons from felsic, trondhjemitic bands of intrusive origin within the Nuvvuagittuq Greenstone Belt only demonstrate that these rocks are older than 3.768 Ga.

== Exhibit ==
- In 2003 a team from the Smithsonian Institution collected a four-ton boulder of Acasta Gneiss Complex for display outside the National Museum of the American Indian in Washington, D.C. Another sample is on display in the Museu de Geociências of the University of Brasília, Brazil.
- In 2006, Peter Skinner and Bert Cervo contributed a small sample of the rock to the Six String Nation project. Part of that material was inlaid into the first fret of Voyageur, the guitar at the heart of the project.
- On the campus of the University of Waterloo in Waterloo, Canada, a boulder from the Acasta Gneiss Complex has been placed in the Peter Russell Rock Garden.
- In 2023, a sample of the Acasta Gneiss was donated by Greg Whitehead to the Central Washington University Geology Department in Ellensburg, WA for display in its geologic timeline hallway.

== See also ==
- Age of the Earth
- Archean felsic volcanic rocks
- Oldest dated rocks
