= Amalgam =

Amalgam most commonly refers to:

- Amalgam (chemistry), mercury alloy
- Amalgam (dentistry), material of silver tooth fillings
  - Bonded amalgam, used in dentistry

Amalgam may also refer to:

- Amalgam Comics, a publisher
- Amalgam Digital, an independent record label in Boston, Massachusetts
- Amalgam, Gauteng, South Africa
- Amalgam, a fictional organization in Full Metal Panic!: The Second Raid
- "Amalgam", a track from the soundtrack of the 2015 video game Undertale by Toby Fox

== See also ==
- Amalgamation (disambiguation)
