= Archean felsic volcanic rocks =

Felsic volcanic rocks formed in the Archean Eon

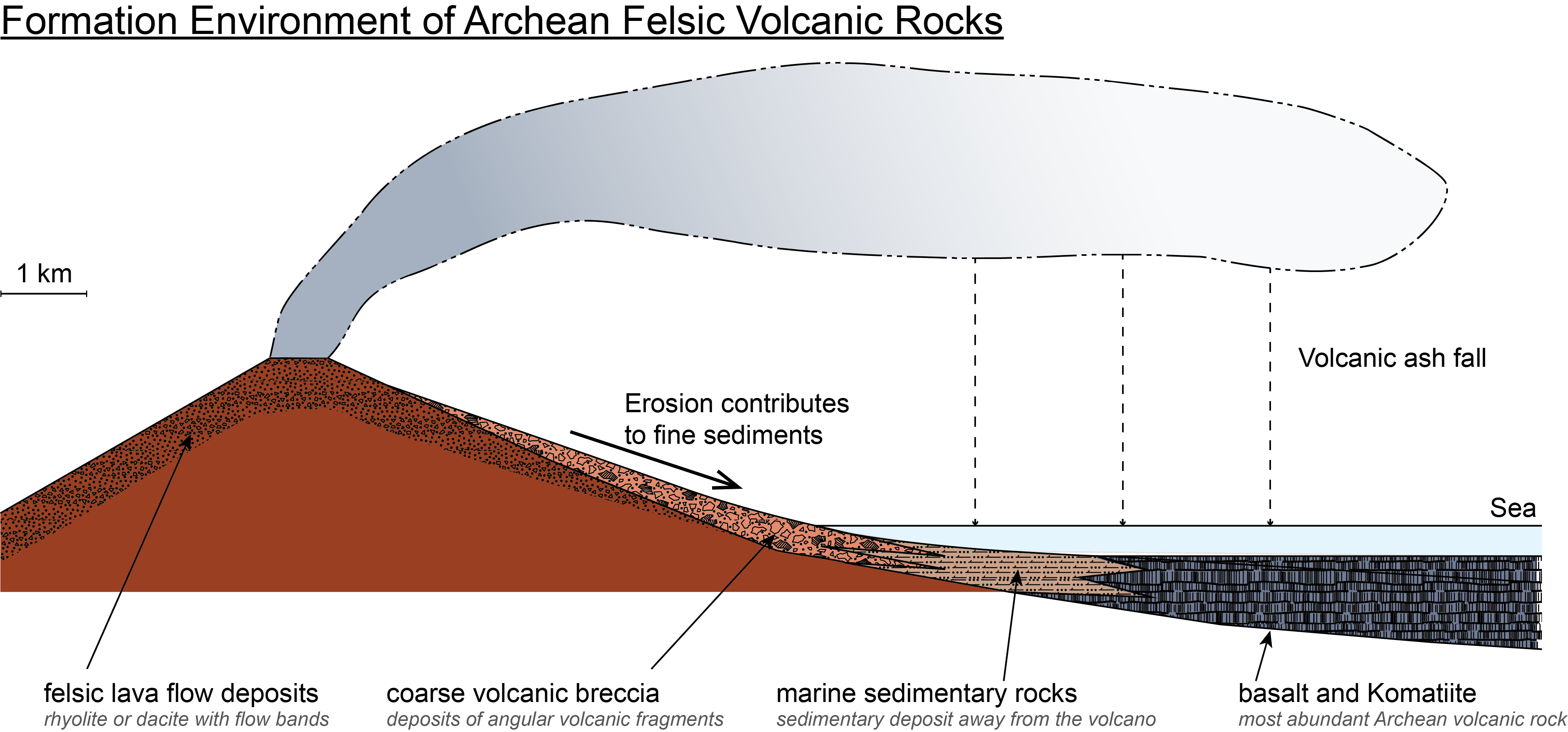
Fig. 1. A schematic diagram showing the formation environment of Archean felsic volcanic rocks. Modified from Giles (1980). Felsic eruption forms felsic volcanic rocks near the volcano and a spectrum of volcano-sedimentary sequence in the sea in Archean.

Archean felsic volcanic rocks are felsic volcanic rocks that were formed in the Archean Eon (4 to 2.5 billion years ago). The term "felsic" means that the rocks have silica content of 62–78%. Given that the Earth formed at ~4.5 billion year ago, Archean felsic volcanic rocks provide clues to the Earth's first volcanic activities on the Earth's surface started 500 million years after the Earth's formation.

As the Archean Earth was hotter than the present, formation of felsic volcanic rocks may differ from the modern plate tectonics.

Archean felsic volcanic rocks are distributed only in the preserved Archean greenstone belts, where deformed sequences of volcanic-sedimentary rocks are common. Felsic volcanic rocks are rare in the early Earth and only contribute to less 20% of rocks in the Archean greenstone belts worldwide. In contrast, mafic volcanic rocks (such as basalt and komatiite, silicate content <52%) occupy about 50% in the greenstone belts. Thus, felsic volcanic rocks are rare members in the Archean terranes.

Archean felsic volcanic activities commonly occur in submarine environments. The composition of Archean felsic volcanic rocks are equivalent to a spectrum between dacite and rhyolite. They can be distinguished by their mineral assemblages, rock chemistry and rock layer relationship in the sequences.

Archean felsic volcanic rocks are utilised to date the timing of geological events and match distant rock units in separated Archean cratons. They are important to reconstruct Archean geological environments.

Felsic granitoids are the most prevalent rock type in Archean terranes. These intrusive felsic igneous rocks include TTG suites (Tonalite-trondhjemite-granodiorite) that contributes over half the portion of Archean cratons. They have implications in finding how the felsic volcanic rocks were formed and related to the granitoids.

== Occurrence ==
Archean felsic volcanic rocks are only preserved in Archean cratons. A craton is an ancient stable continental block. Also, a craton has survived from plate tectonics that pull apart, collide or tear continents. On average, the felsic volcanic rocks only contribute to ≈15-20% in volcanic rocks of greenstone belts. See Figure 2 and Table 1 for Examples of Archean felsic volcanic rocks occurrence.

All Archean felsic volcanic rocks are distributed in greenstone belts. In Archean cratons, greenstone belts represent supracrustal rocks formed at the Earth's surface and the belts are dominated by volcano-sedimentary sequences. Some volcanic sequences can be several kilometers thick, such as the Warrawoona Group of Eastern Pilbara Craton. However, ultramafic and mafic units make up the major volume of the volcanic units. The remaining volcanic units are extensive but thin felsic volcanic layers, such as Duffer Formation of the Warrawoona Group. The greenstone belts may be subsequently intruded by dome-shaped magma chambers. The intrusion deformed the felsic volcanic rocks along with the volcano-sedimentary sequences.

Observing modern volcanic processes is relatively easier than observing Archean volcanism, because erosion constantly started removing earlier formed materials. So, studying the Archean supracrustal rocks back in deep time may be subjected to sampling bias.

Table 1. Examples of Archean felsic volcanic rocks occurrence in greenstone belts
Felsic volcanic units/localities	Age (Ma)	Greenstone belt	Craton	Country/Region
Duffer Formation	3468 ± 2	Warrawoona	Eastern Pilbara Craton	Australia
Marda Tank	2734 ± 3	Marda Volcanic Complex	Yilgarn Craton	Australia
Kallehadlu Felsic Volcanics	2677 ± 2	Gadag-Chitradurga	Dharwar Craton	India
Kovero schist belt	2754 ± 6	Ilomantsi	Baltic Shield	Finland
Sample SM/GR/93/57	3710 ± 4	Isua	North Atlantic Craton	Greenland
Musk massive sulphide deposit	2689.3 +2.4/-1.8	Yellowknife	Slave Province	Canada
Blake River Group	2694.1±4.5	Abitibi	Superior Province	Canada
Upper Michipicoten volcanic sequences	2696 ± 2	Wawa	Superior Province	Canada
Bulawayan Group	2615 ± 28	Harare	Zimbabwean Craton	Zimbabwe
Onverwacht Group	3445 ± 3	Barberton	Kaapvaal Craton	South Africa

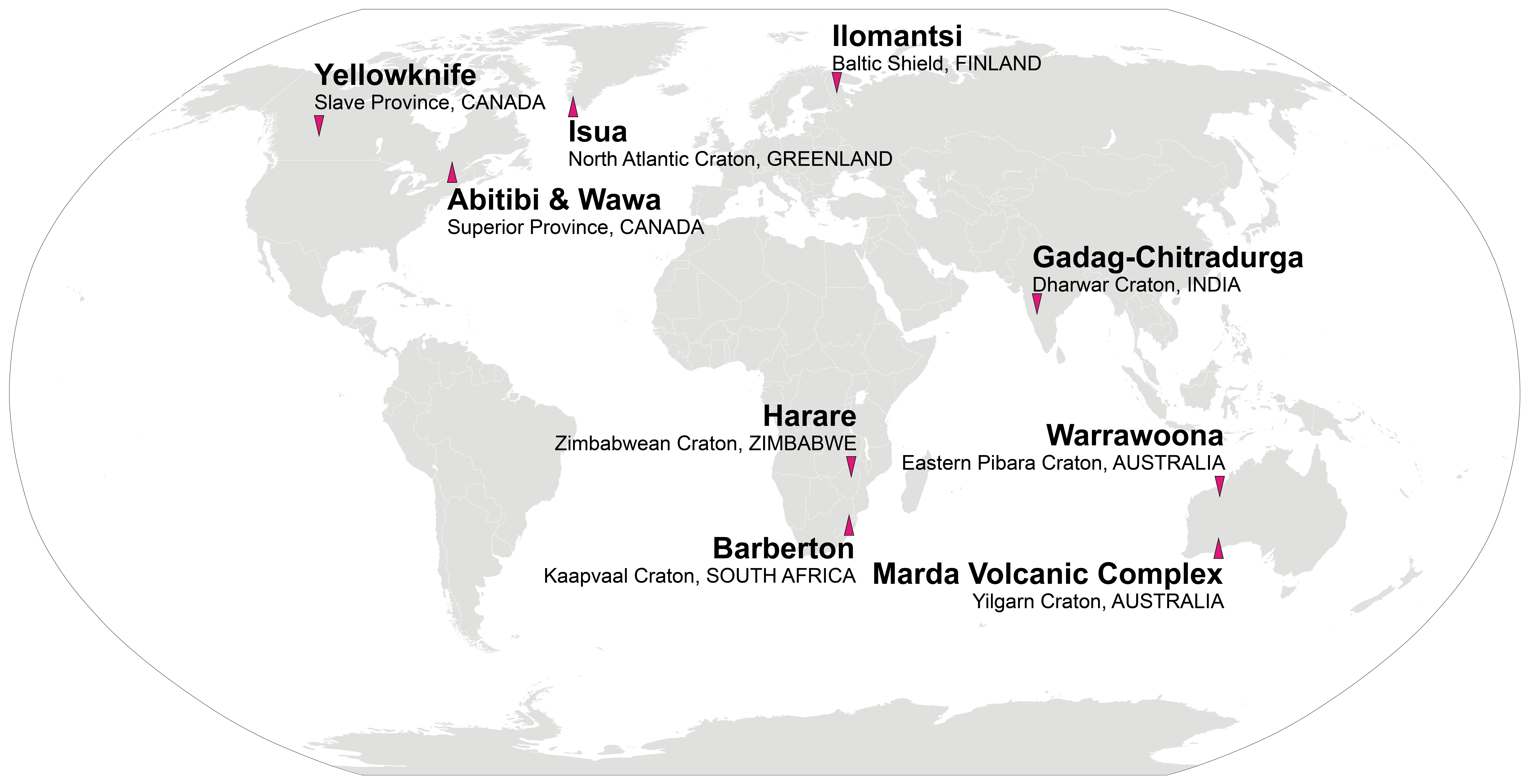
Fig. 2. A map showing examples greenstone belts with documented Archean felsic volcanic rocks localities. See citations in Table 1.

== Characteristics ==
=== Mineralogy and texture ===
The meaning of "felsic" refers to high silica (SiO_{2}) content from 62 to 78 wt% in rock. In terms of mineralogy, the felsic volcanic rocks are rich in feldspar and quartz. A typical mineral assemblage is quartz + feldspar (albite/oligoclase) + amphibole (chlorite) + micas (biotite and/or muscovite). The mineralogy seems similar with modern rhyolites and dacites. The volcanics are aphanitic, whereas some exhibits porphyritic texture that certain larger minerals (phenocrysts) are visible by eyes.

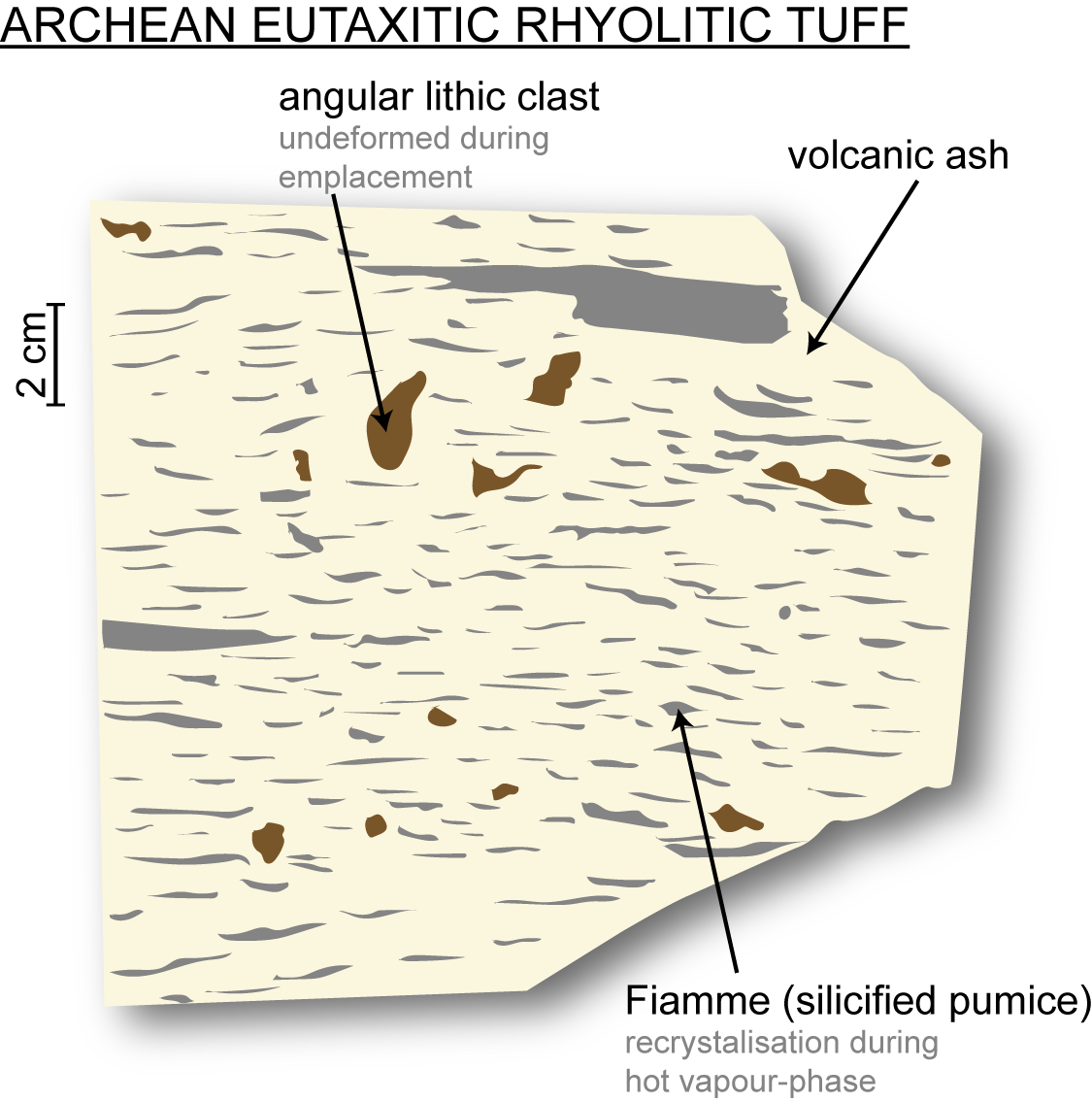
Fig. 3. Archean felsic volcanic rocks have particular characteristic structure. Some are tuffs, formed by volcanic materials from eruption. A significant structure is fiamme, which are recrystallised quartz with flame-like ending points. The illustration is fiamme in Archean Woman Lake rhyolitic tuff, Superior Province, Canada. Adopted and modified from photograph of Thurston (1980).

Felsic volcanic rocks also include felsic tuff that was formed when tephra was consolidated. Tuff is composed of volcanic ash, glass shards and lithic fragments. Reported eutaxitic tuff from Superior Province, Canada (Figure 3), contains lenticular fiamme. When hot pumice deposits on a cool surface, it is rapidly cooled, recrystallised and welded into quartz with flame-like ending tips. The eutaxitic texture represents a hot vapour-phase emplacement of the fragmented volcanic materials on the Earth's surface.

Flow bands are present in massive, uniform felsic lava flow units. When the viscous lava flow encounters a surface, friction drags the mobile lava and forms internal banding.

Structureless hyaloclastite is commonly found in Archean felsic volcanic rocks. In submarine environments, water quenches and cools lava rapidly during volcanic eruption. The flow is fragmented and form glassy volcanic breccia.

=== Geochemistry ===
The composition of Archean felsic volcanic rocks falls in the calc-alkaline series. Such magmatic series indicate that fractional crystallisation of magma occurred during cooling. Magnesium and iron content in the rock are low, and it forms dacite or rhyolite. Magma is a mixture of various minerals. When minerals crystallise from the molten magma, they are progressively removed and dissociated from the melt. The last proportion of the melt is strongly fractionated, causing richness in quartz and feldspars that make the volcanic rocks felsic.

Dacite and rhyolite are characterised by high silica (SiO_{2}) content from 62 to 78 wt%. The average composition of felsic volcanic rocks in Archean greenstone belts is between dacite and rhyolite (Table 2). In comparison, the modern felsic volcanic rock average composition (after Archean, <2.5 Ga) is similar to rhyolite, indicating a more felsic shift with greater alkali content in felsic volcanism. However, the composition may be biased because of weathering right after deposition or metamorphism during later stages of deformation.

Table 2. Average composition of felsic volcanic rocks
Time	SiO_{2} (wt%)	Na_{2}O+K_{2}O (wt%)	Rock Classification
Archean	72.2–73.0	6.4–6.8	Dacite–Rhyolite
Post-Archean	73.0–73.6	7.0–8.0	Rhyolite

Archean felsic volcanic rocks also have high zircon abundance. Incompatible elements, like zirconium, are reluctant to substitute into early-forming crystals. As a result, they tend to remain in the melt. In strongly fractionated felsic magma, zircon is easily saturated. As a result, zircon is common in felsic rocks. The timing of felsic volcanism and tectonic constraints can be identified by radiometric dating and isotopic analysis.

== Eruption style ==
In the Archean aeon, underwater eruptions of felsic lava were common. Submarine eruption is evident by coarse volcanic breccia formed in situ, hyaloclastite or underwater pyroclastic deposits (clastic rock, composed of tephra only). Since felsic magma is viscous, volcanic eruptions that form dacite or rhyolite are explosive and violent. The Archean felsic eruption may be assigned to Vesuvius eruption type in the present day.

Submarine rhyolitic flows were widespread in the Archean but are uncommon in the modern volcanic environment. Viscous felsic eruption often causes pyroclastic flow (hot, dense gas with volcanic fragments) instead of fluid lava flow. However, if the rhyolitic lava is still molten during eruption, it can behave and flow like fluid lava.

=== Subaqueous deposits ===
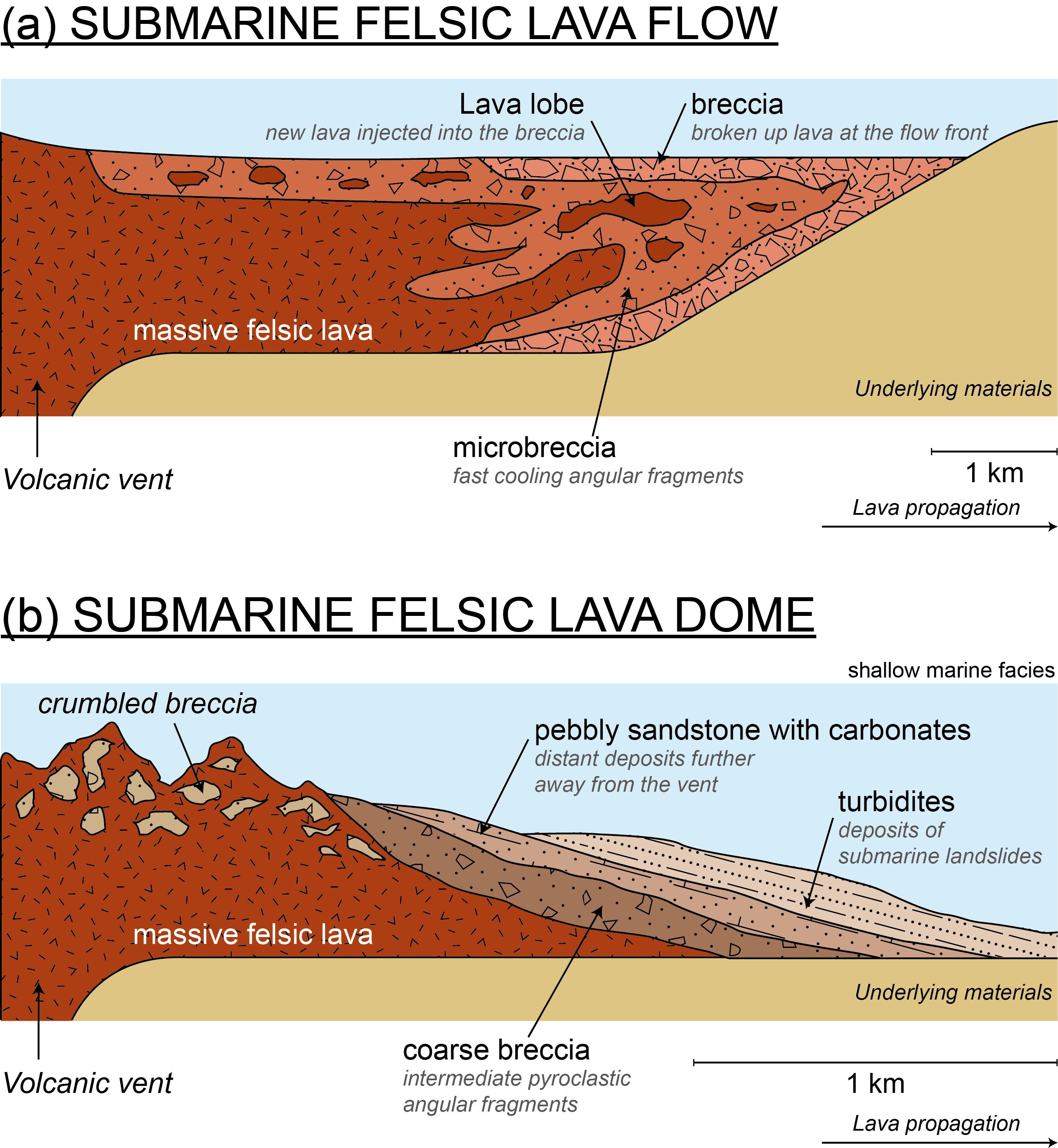
Fig. 4. Schematic illustration of documented subaqueous felsic lava deposits. (a) Submarine lava flow, based on Héré Creek rhyolite (modified from De Rosen-Spence et al., 1980). (b) Submarine lava dome, based on the Gold Lake dome and flow complex (modified from Lambert et al., 1990). Illustration adopted from Sylvester et al. (1997) in de Wit & Ashwal (1997).

Felsic lava flow and lava dome are the two common types of underwater deposits formed by Archean felsic volcanic rocks (Fig. 4). Documented Archean lava structures are distinctive from post-Archean felsic lava because underwater eruptions are so rare in the post-Archean. The dacitic or rhyolitic lava flows are quenched right after the eruption. When seawater contacts the flow, the lava quickly cools down. Finally, The lava solidifies and breaks up as clasts, and the clasts accumulate on the flow fronts to form breccia.

==== Lava flow ====
Effusive felsic lava flows elongate several kilometres. During an eruption, lava continuously wells out from the vent, then starts to flow outward on the sea floor. Due to quenching, lava is rapidly fragmented to form breccia. A new lobe of lava is injected inside the breccia but it is cooled less quickly, and pushes the flow further outwards.

==== Lava dome ====
Short, stocky dome with subsequent pyroclastic deposits extend less than few kilometres long. When explosive eruption occurs, volcanic fragments would be deposited by violent pyroclastic flows. Coarse breccia would be formed as a result. Submarine sediments would subsequently be deposited along the steep flank of the volcano. Submarine landslides would occur to form turbidites.

=== Stratigraphic significance ===
Archean felsic volcanic rocks are important in determining absolute age of the rock units in greenstone belts. Felsic eruptions are episodic, making the felsic volcanic layers distinctive stratigraphic units. Also, felsic volcanic rocks are distributed across long distances because of their extensive deposition. However, the rock sequences of greenstone belts are commonly obscured by later deformation, such as regional folding or intrusion of granitoids. By identifying these felsic sequences and dating their time of formation, stratigraphic units of different locations can be correlated despite the obstacles or discontinuity between felsic volcanic units.

==== Timing of volcanism ====
The geochronology of Archean events strongly relies on U-Pb dating and Lu-Hf dating. Since mafic rocks (contain low silica content, such as basalt) are lack of zircon, only the age of felsic rocks can be dated among the volcanic rocks in greenstone belts. As felsic volcanic rocks are episodically deposited in between mafic layers, the age range of a particular mafic layer can be constrained by the upper and lower felsic volcanic layers. Thus the time of occurrence and the duration of volcanic episodes can be revealed.

== Relationships between Archean felsic volcanic rocks and granitoids ==
=== From TTG to GMS granitoids ===
Two plutonic, igneous rock suites form 50% of Archean cratons. They are (1) Tonalite-trondhjemite-granodiorite (TTG) suites and (2) Granite-Monzonite-Syenite (GMS) suites in chronological order. They are magma chambers that later formed the volcanics on the Earth's surface by volcanic eruption. Later they intruded the supracrustal rocks of similar age and composition in the Archean. The uprising magma bodies deformed the surface greenstone belt on a cratonic scale.

Table 3. Comparison between 2 common Archean Granitoids
Relative age	Granitoid	Important mineral present	Magma origin
Older (1st granitoid)	Tonalite-trondhjemite-granodiorite (TTG)	Na-rich plagioclase + garnet + amphibole	hydrated mafic crust
Younger (2nd granitoid)	Granite-Monzonite-Syenite (GMS)	K-feldspar	felsic crust

The two kinds of granitoids have different magma origins: (a) melting of water-rich mafic materials formed older sodium-rich TTG and (b) melting of felsic materials (e.g. TTG and/or sediments) formed younger potassium-rich GMS (see Table 3). They imply gradual chemical changes in the magma and the Earth's crust.

=== Conflicting compositions ===
Records of Archean felsic volcanic rocks shows a peculiar trend. The eruption of felsic volcanic rocks and plutonic activities in Archean are largely synchronised as show in overlapping zircon ages. On contrary, the chemical compositions of some felsic volcanic rocks are similar to that of GMS but they are much older than GMS. For example, a GMS-like rhyolite unit in the Abitibi Greenstone Belt (abnormally more enriched in potassium and heavy rare-earth elements than other Archean felsic volcanic rocks) has no plutonic equivalent in the same period. The composition of felsic volcanic rocks are being altered concurrently with shifting granitoid composition.

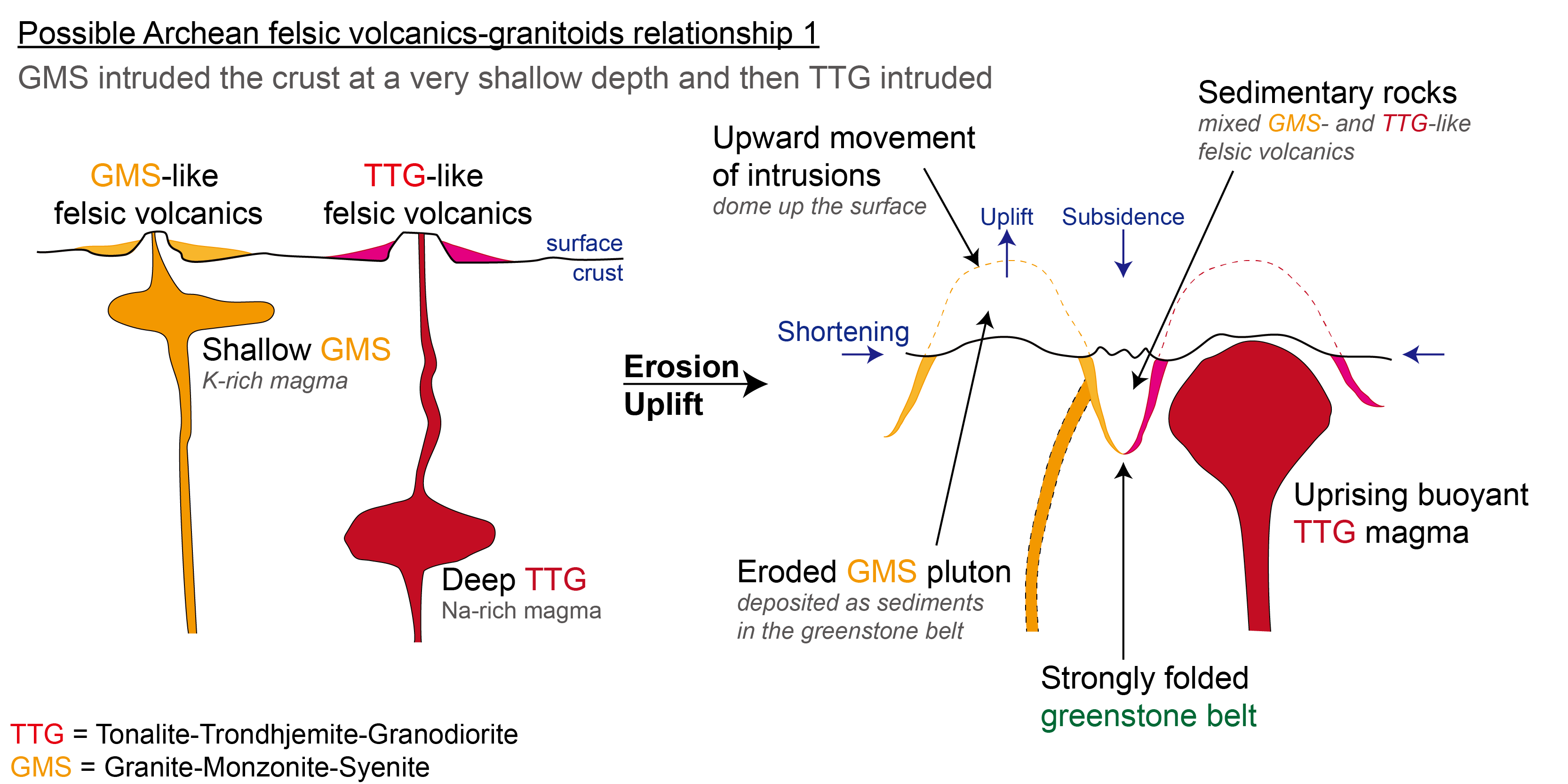
Fig 5. Possible relationship 1 of Archean felsic volcanic rocks and granitoids. GMS may have intruded the crust at a very shallow depth, and later TTG intruded.

=== Possible relationships ===
The older GMS-like felsic volcanic rocks formed with similar age of TTG has two implications:

1. GMS may have intruded the crust and GMS-like volcanics at a very shallow depth. Later, intense erosion rips up all GMS suites and deposited at a proximal distance. If this is true, then GMS and TTG intruded the crust together at the same time. No solid evidence is present yet but the irregular geochemical fingerprints may link both to TTG or GMS.
2. GMS is concentrated at the upper crust and TTG at deeper intermediate crust. Later, GMS as well as GMS-like volcanics are eroded and deposit as sediments. The detrital zircons may show a range of mixed GMS and TTG geochemical signature.

=== Limitation ===
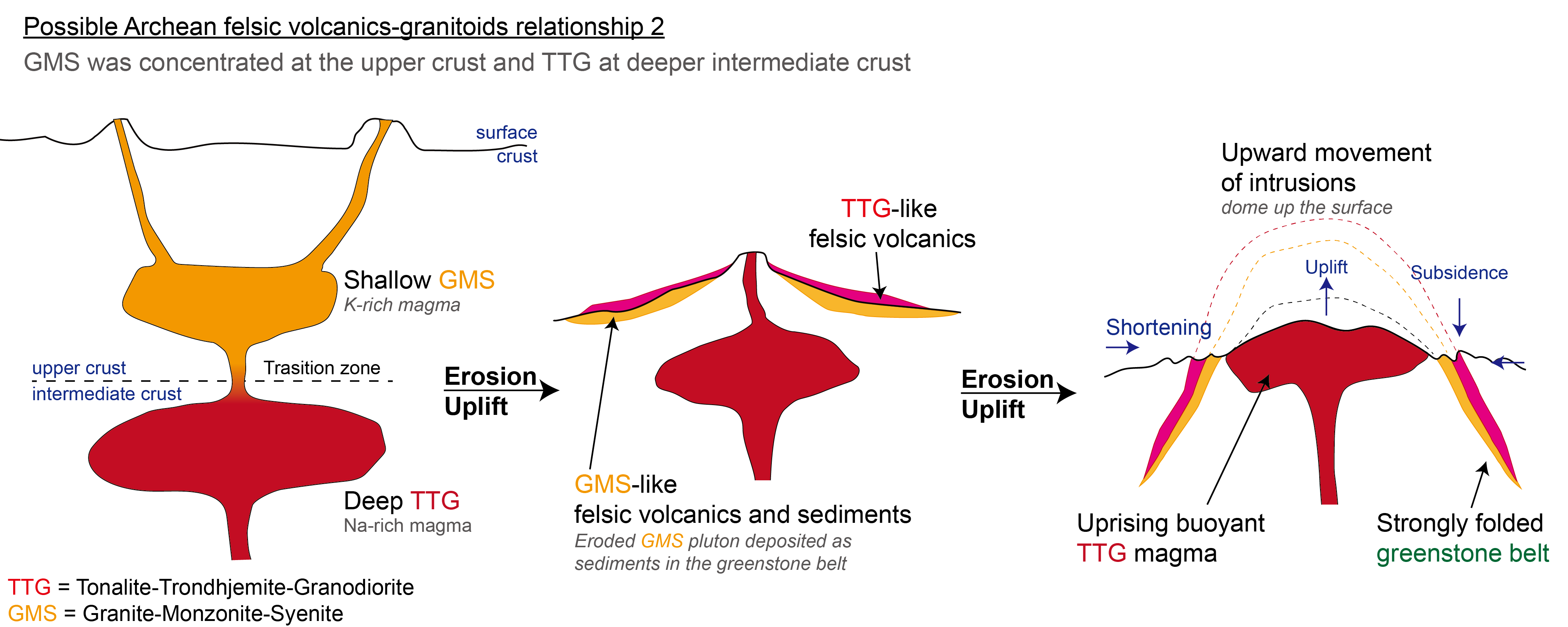
Fig 6. Possible relationship 2 of Archean felsic volcanic rocks and granitoids. GMS and TTG may have intruded the crust at the same time. Yet, GMS was concentrated at the upper crust and TTG at deeper intermediate crust.

Revealing the relationship between Archean felsic volcanic rocks and the granitoids may be difficult. It is because weathering alters the geochemical signatures of the felsic rocks above the Earth's surface. The earliest weathering record can be traced back to 3.8 Ga during Eoarchean. Potassium is enriched but sodium is depleted in these weathered felsic rocks. Altered feldspars in the rocks may result in such anomalous signatures.

== See also ==
- Eoarchean geology
- Tectonic evolution of the Barberton greenstone belt
