= National Amalgamated Central, Local & Parastatal Manual Workers' Union =

Trade union in Botswana

NACL&PMWU
- National Amalgamated Central, Local & Parastatal Manual Workers' Union
- Headquarters: Gaborone, Botswana
- Location: Botswana
- Key people: Simon Kgaoganang, general secretary
- Affiliations: BOFEPUSU, PSI

The National Amalgamated Central, Local and Parastatal Manual Workers' Union (often referred to as The Manual Workers) is a trade union in Botswana.
