= Dominica Amalgamated Workers' Union =

DAWU
- Dominica Amalgamated Workers' Union
- Type: Trade union
- Headquarters: Roseau, Dominica
- Location: Dominica
- Key people: Elias Leah Shillingford, acting general secretary
- Affiliations: International Trade Union Confederation
- Website: Facebook page

The Dominica Amalgamated Workers' Union is a trade union in Dominica. It is affiliated with the International Trade Union Confederation.
