= Gneiss =

Common high-grade metamorphic rock

- Metamorphic rock
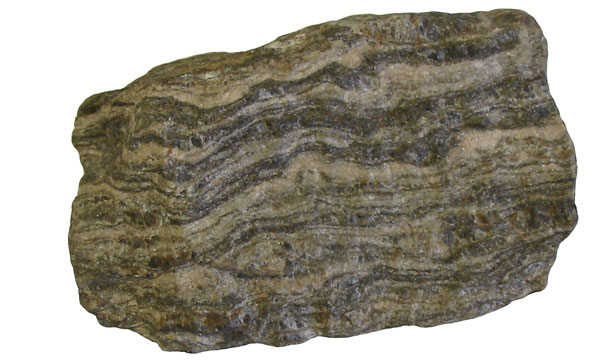
- Sample of gneiss exhibiting "gneissic banding"

Composition
- Classification: Felsic to ultramafic
- Primary: Feldspar, quartz, amphibole, mica
- Secondary: Garnet, zircon, corundum, olivine, pyroxene
- Texture: Gneissic banding

Gneiss (/naɪs/ NYSE) is a common and widely distributed type of metamorphic rock. It is formed by high-temperature and high-pressure metamorphic processes acting on formations composed of igneous or sedimentary rocks. This rock is formed under pressures ranging from 2 to 15 kbar, sometimes even more, and temperatures over 300 °C (572 °F). Gneiss nearly always shows a banded texture characterized by alternating darker and lighter colored bands and without a distinct cleavage.

Gneisses are common in the ancient crust of continental shields. Some of the oldest rocks on Earth are gneisses, such as the Acasta Gneiss.

== Description ==
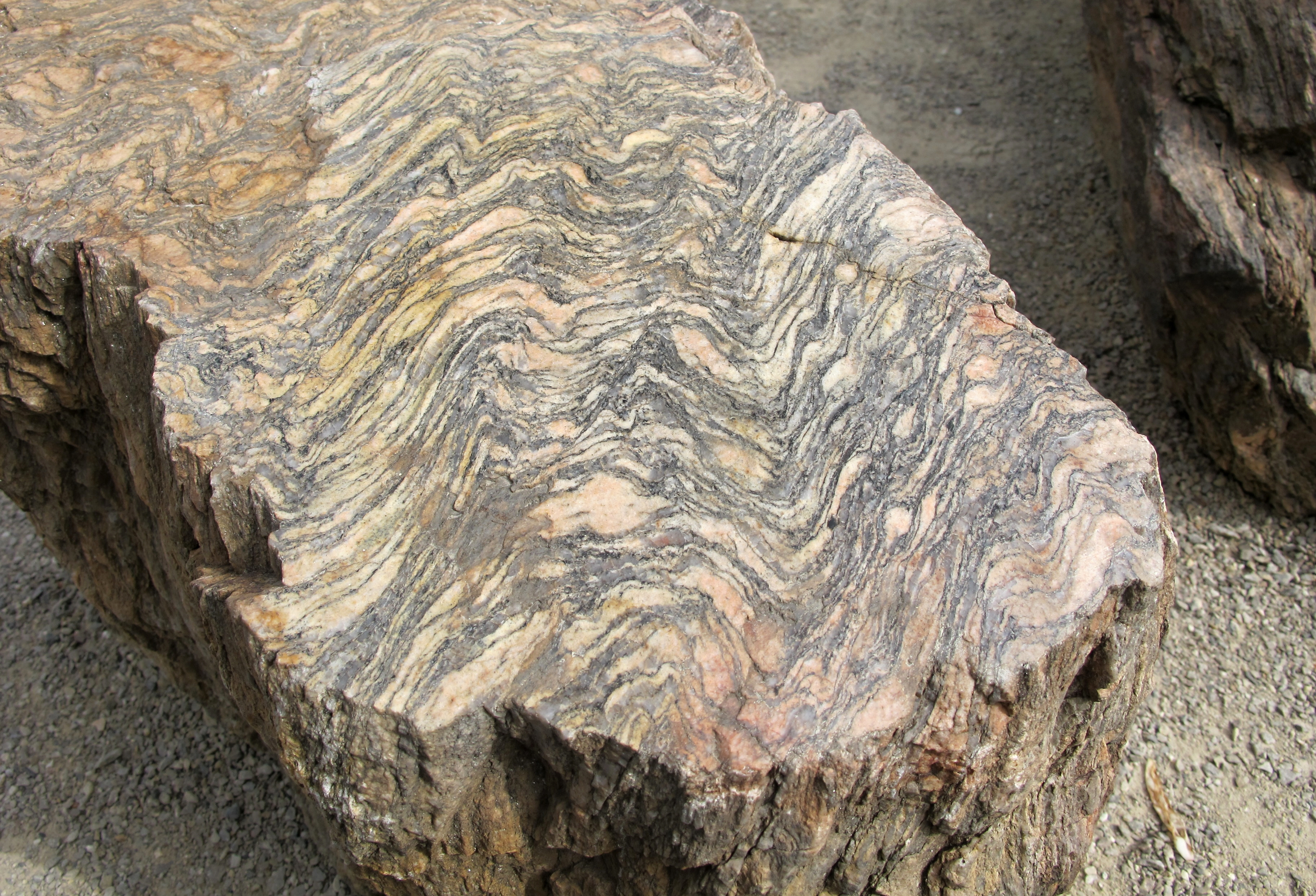
Orthogneiss from the Czech Republic

In traditional English and North American usage, a gneiss is a coarse-grained metamorphic rock showing compositional banding (gneissic banding) but poorly developed schistosity and indistinct cleavage. In other words, it is a metamorphic rock composed of mineral grains easily seen with the unaided eye, which form obvious compositional layers, but which has only a weak tendency to fracture along these layers. In Europe, the term has been more widely applied to any coarse, mica-poor, high-grade metamorphic rock.

The British Geological Survey (BGS) and the International Union of Geological Sciences (IUGS) both use gneiss as a broad textural category for medium- to coarse-grained metamorphic rock that shows poorly developed schistosity, with compositional layering over 5 millimeters (0.20 in) thick and tending to split into plates over 1 centimeter (0.39 in) thick. Neither definition depends on composition or origin, though rocks poor in platy minerals are more likely to produce gneissose texture. Gneissose rocks thus are largely recrystallized but do not carry large quantities of micas, chlorite or other platy minerals. Metamorphic rock showing stronger schistosity is classified as schist, while metamorphic rock devoid of schistosity is called a granofels.

Gneisses that are metamorphosed igneous rocks or their equivalent are termed granite gneisses, diorite gneisses, and so forth. Gneiss rocks may also be named after a characteristic component such as garnet gneiss, biotite gneiss, albite gneiss, and so forth. Orthogneiss designates a gneiss derived from an igneous rock, and paragneiss is one from a sedimentary rock. Both the BGS and the IUGS use gneissose to describe rocks with the texture of gneiss, though gneissic also remains in common use. For example, a gneissose metagranite or a gneissic metagranite both mean a granite that has been metamorphosed and thereby acquired gneissose texture.

=== Gneissic banding ===
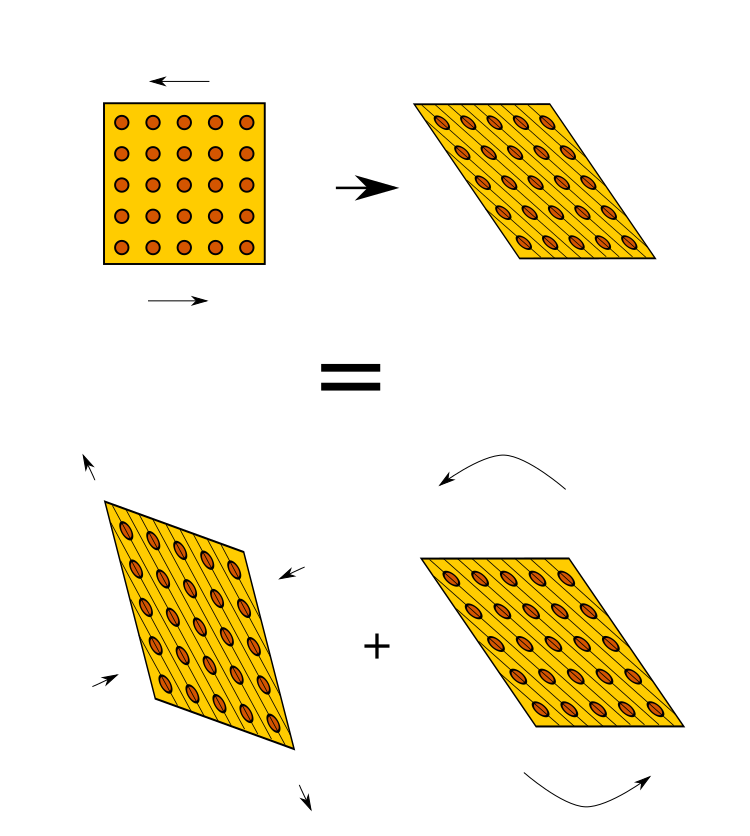
Pure shear deformation of rock producing gneissic banding. The undeformed rock is shown at upper left, and the result of pure shear deformation at upper right. At lower left is the stretching component of the deformation, which compresses the rock in one direction and stretches it in the other, as shown by the arrows. The rock is simultaneously rotated to produce the final configuration, repeated at lower right.

The minerals in gneiss are arranged into layers that appear as bands in cross section. This is called gneissic banding. The darker bands have relatively more mafic minerals (those containing more magnesium and iron). The lighter bands contain relatively more felsic minerals (minerals such as feldspar or quartz, which contain more of the lighter elements, such as aluminium, sodium, and potassium).

The banding is developed at high temperature when the rock is more strongly compressed in one direction than in other directions (nonhydrostatic stress). The bands develop perpendicular to the direction of greatest compression, also called the shortening direction, as platy minerals are rotated or recrystallized into parallel layers.

A common cause of nonhydrostatic stress is the subjection of the protolith (the original rock material that undergoes metamorphism) to extreme shearing force, a sliding force similar to the pushing of the top of a deck of cards in one direction, and the bottom of the deck in the other direction. These forces stretch out the rock like a plastic, and the original material is spread out into sheets. Per the polar decomposition theorem, the deformation produced by such shearing force is equivalent to rotation of the rock combined with shortening in one direction and extension in another.

Some banding is formed from original rock material (protolith) that is subjected to extreme temperature and pressure and is composed of alternating layers of sandstone (lighter) and shale (darker), which is metamorphosed into bands of quartzite and mica.

Another cause of banding is "metamorphic differentiation", which separates different materials into different layers through chemical reactions, a process not fully understood.

=== Augen gneiss ===
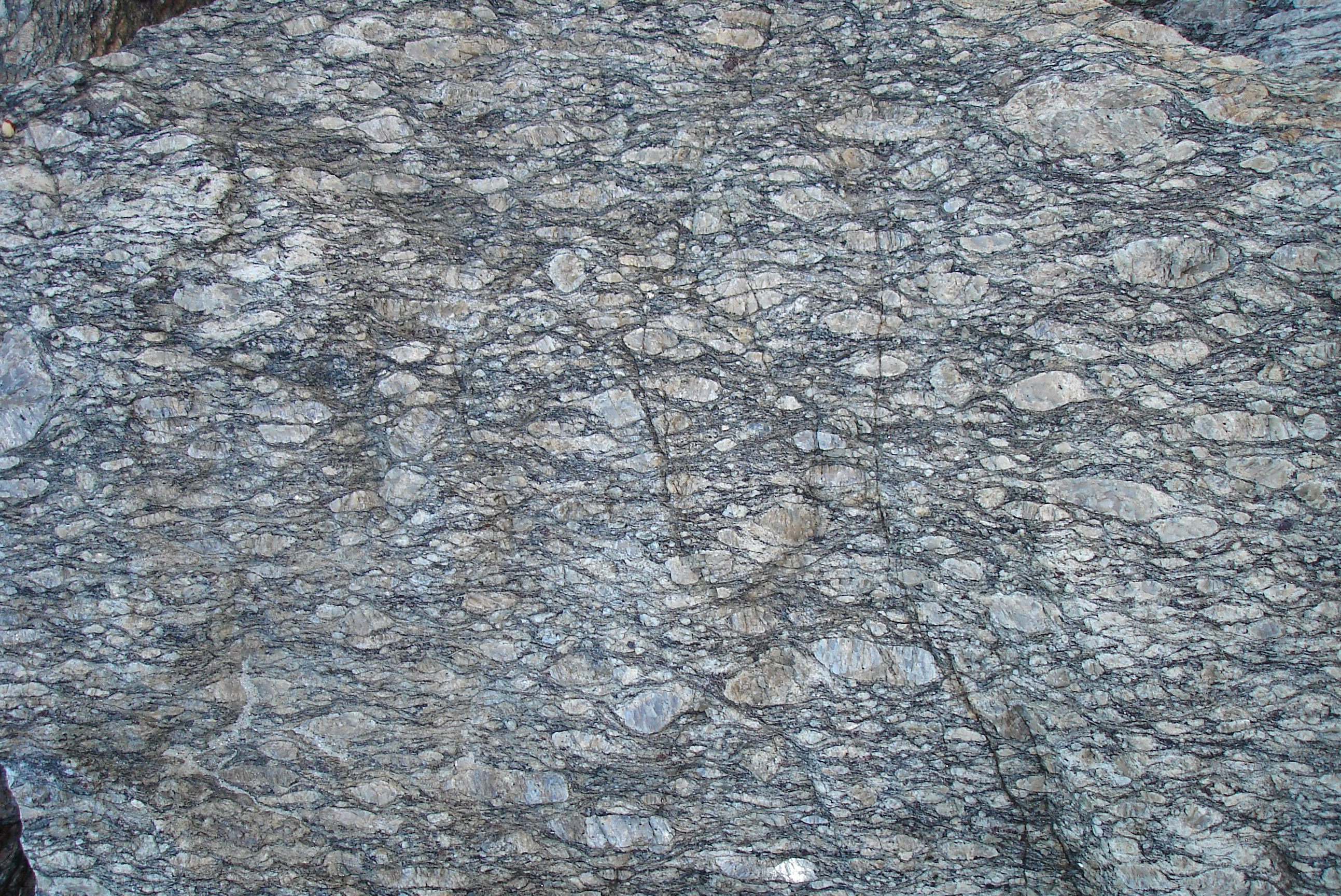
Augen gneiss from Leblon, Rio de Janeiro City, Brazil

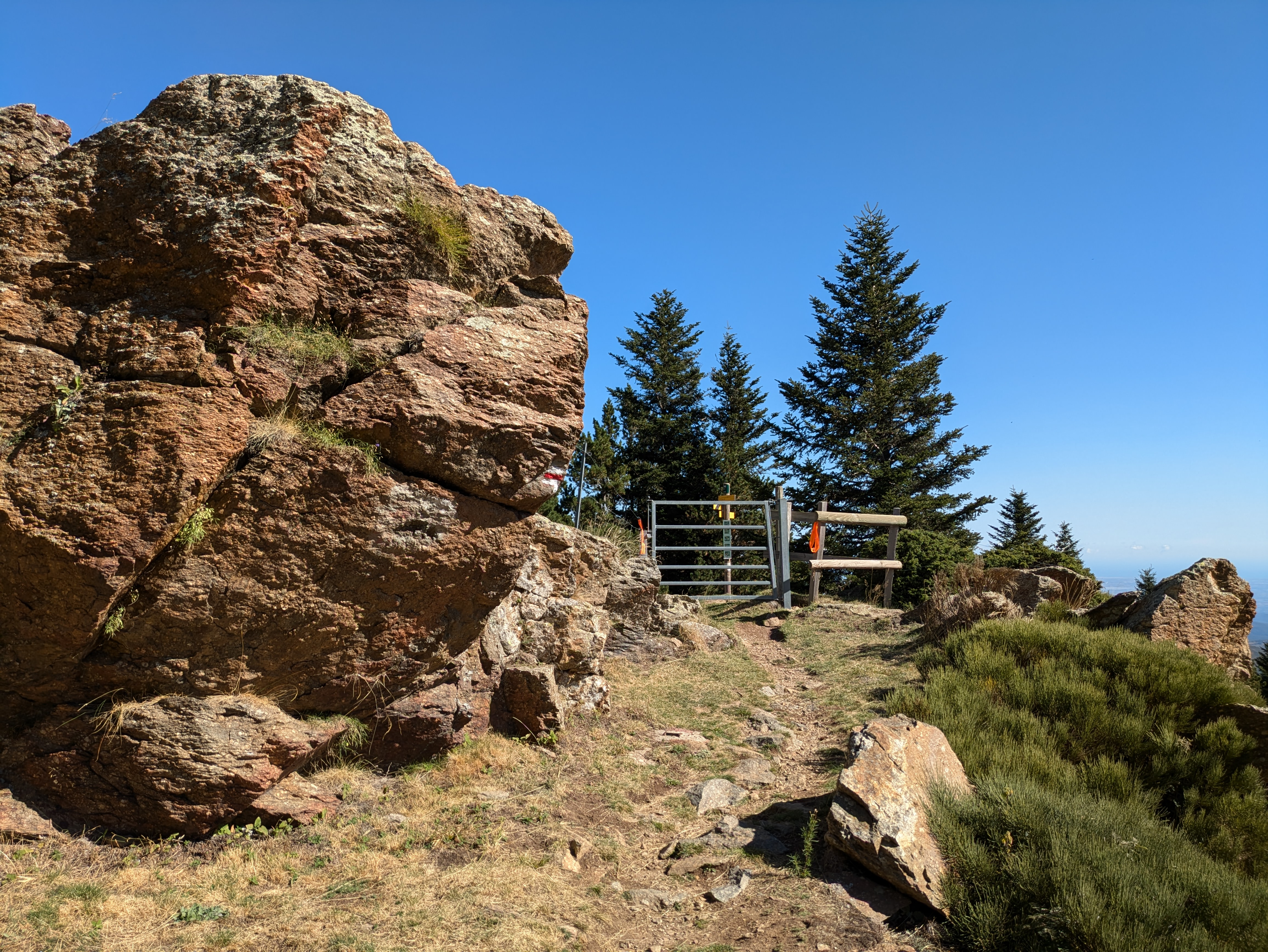
Ordovician augen gneiss outcrop, Canigó massif, eastern Pyrenees, France

Augen gneiss, from the German: Augen [ˈaʊɡən], meaning "eyes", is a gneiss resulting from metamorphism of granite, which contains characteristic elliptic or lenticular shear-bound grains (porphyroclasts), normally feldspar, surrounded by finer grained material. The finer grained material deforms around the more resistant feldspar grains to produce this texture.

=== Migmatite ===
Migmatite is a gneiss consisting of two or more distinct rock types, one of which has the appearance of an ordinary gneiss (the mesosome), and another of which has the appearance of an intrusive rock such as pegmatite, aplite, or granite (the leucosome). The rock may also contain a melanosome of mafic rock complementary to the leucosome. Migmatites are often interpreted as rock that has been partially melted, with the leucosome representing the silica-rich melt, the melanosome the residual solid rock left after partial melting, and the mesosome the original rock that has not yet experienced partial melting.

== Occurrences ==
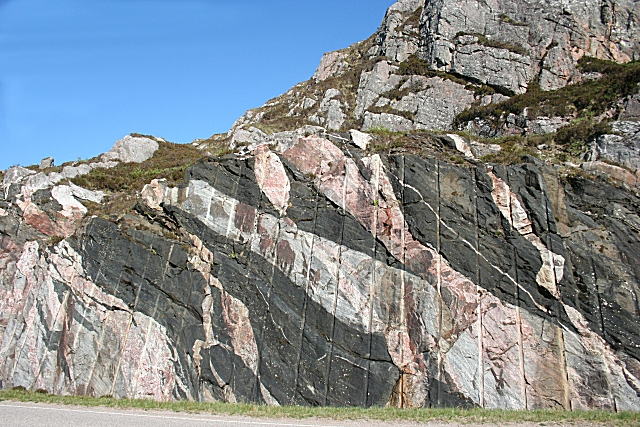
Dark dikes (now foliated amphibolites) cutting light grey Lewisian gneiss of the Scourie complex, both deformed and cut by later (unfoliated) pink granite dikes

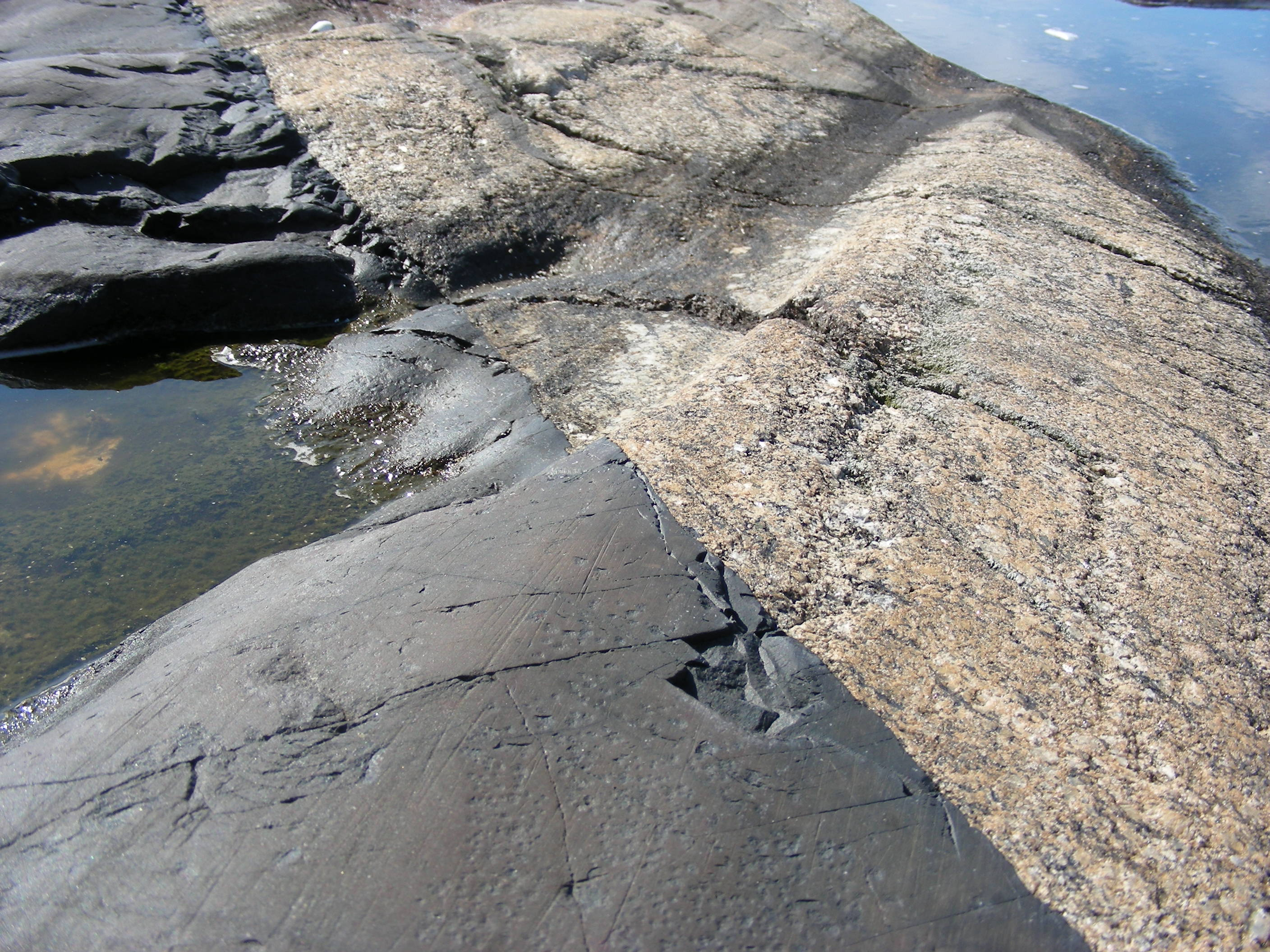
Contact between a dark-colored diabase dike (about 1100 million years old) and light-colored migmatitic paragneiss in the Kosterhavet National Park in the Koster Islands off the western coast of Sweden.

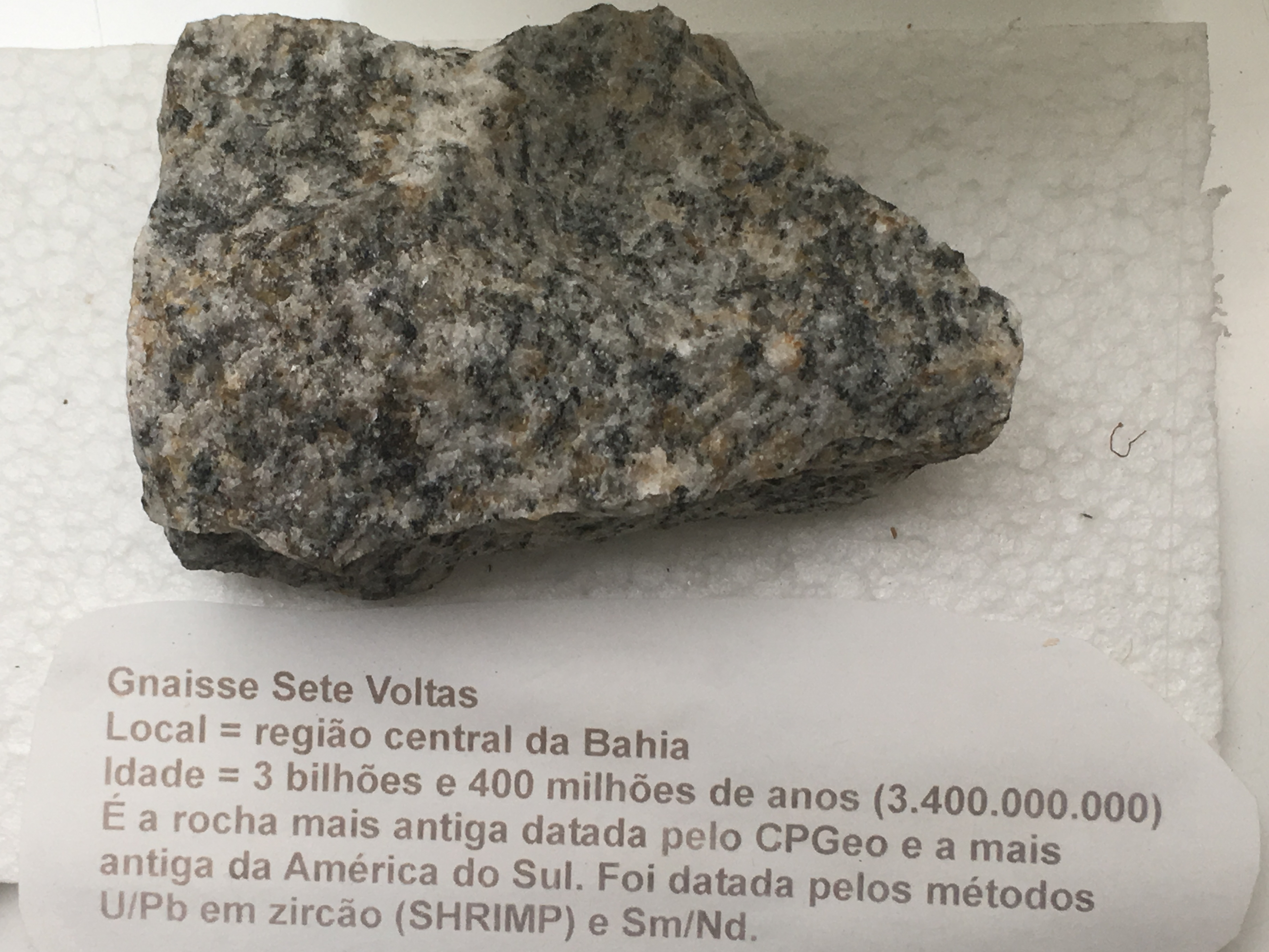
Sample of Sete Voltas gneiss from Bahia in Brazil, the oldest rock outcropping in the crust of South America, c. 3.4 billion years old (Archean)

Gneisses are characteristic of areas of regional metamorphism that reaches the middle amphibolite to granulite metamorphic facies. In other words, the rock was metamorphosed at a temperature in excess of 600 °C (1,112 °F) at pressures between about 2 to 24 kbar. Many different varieties of rock can be metamorphosed to gneiss, so geologists are careful to add descriptions of the color and mineral composition to the name of any gneiss, such as garnet-biotite paragneiss or grayish-pink orthogneiss.

=== Granite-greenstone belts ===
Continental shields are regions of exposed ancient rock that make up the stable cores of continents. The rock exposed in the oldest regions of shields, which is of Archean age (over 2500 million years old), mostly belong to granite-greenstone belts. The greenstone belts contain metavolcanic and metasedimentary rock that has undergone a relatively mild grade of metamorphism, at temperatures of 350–500 °C (662–932 °F) and pressures of 200–500 MPa (2,000–5,000 bar). The greenstone belts are surrounded by high-grade gneiss terrains showing highly deformed low-pressure, high-temperature (over 500 °C (932 °F)) metamorphism to the amphibolite or granulite facies. These form most of the exposed rock in Archean cratons.

=== Gneiss domes ===
Gneiss domes are common in orogenic belts (regions of mountain formation). They consist of a dome of gneiss intruded by younger granite and migmatite and mantled with sedimentary rock. These have been interpreted as a geologic record of two distinct mountain-forming events, with the first producing the granite basement and the second deforming and melting this basement to produce the domes. However, some gneiss domes may actually be the cores of metamorphic core complexes, regions of the deep crust brought to the surface and exposed during extension of the Earth's crust.

=== Examples ===
- The Acasta Gneiss is found in the Northwest Territories, Canada, on an island about 300 kilometers (190 mi) north of Yellowknife. This is one of the most ancient intact crustal fragments on Earth, metamorphosed 3.58 to 4.031 billion years ago.
- The Lewisian gneiss is found throughout the Outer Hebrides of Scotland, on the Scottish mainland west of the Moine Thrust, and on the islands of Coll and Tiree. These rocks are largely igneous in origin, mixed with metamorphosed marble, quartzite and mica schist with later intrusions of basaltic dikes and granite magma.
- The Morton Gneiss is an Archean-age gneiss exposed in the Minnesota River Valley of southwestern Minnesota, United States. It is thought to be the oldest intact block of continental crust in the United States.
- The Peninsular Gneiss is a sequence of Archean gneisses found throughout the Indian Shield and ranging in age from 3400 to 2500 million years old.

== Etymology ==
The word gneiss has been used in English since at least 1757. It is borrowed from the German word Gneis, formerly also spelled Gneiss, which is probably derived from the Middle High German noun gneist "spark" (so called because the rock glitters).

== Uses ==
Gneiss is used as a building material, such as the Facoidal gneiss. It's used extensively in Rio de Janeiro. Gneiss has also been used as construction aggregate for asphalt pavement.

== See also ==
- List of rock types
- Glossary of geology
