= Amalgamated (1917 automobile) =

Defunct American motor vehicle manufacturer

The Amalgamated was made by the Amalgamated Machinery Corp of Chicago, Illinois, from 1917 to 1919. The Amalgamated Six used a special engine which featured positively opened poppet valves. Instead of disc cams that would only lift, grooved cylindrical cams of the type similar to those in machine tools and other machinery were utilized. Aside from that, the Amalgamated was an assembled car, and only a few were made.
