= Amalgam, Gauteng =

Amalgam
- Location within Gauteng Location within South Africa
- Coordinates: 26°12′41″S 28°00′14″E
- Country: South Africa
- Province: Gauteng
- Municipality: City of Johannesburg
- Main Place: Johannesburg

Area
  - Total: 1.47 km^{2} (0.57 sq mi)

Population (2011)
  - Total: 108
  - Density: 73.5/km^{2} (190/sq mi)

Racial makeup (2011)
  - Black African: 13.0%
  - Coloured: 0.9%
  - Other: 86.1%

First languages (2011)
  - Tsonga: 3.7%
  - English: 1.9%
  - Tswana: 1.9%
  - Other: 92.6%
- Time zone: UTC+2 (SAST)
- Postal code (street): 2092

Amalgam is a suburb of Johannesburg, South Africa. It is located in Region B.
