= Volcano-sedimentary sequence =

Stratigraphic sequence

A volcano-sedimentary sequence is a stratigraphic succession composed of interbedded volcanic, sedimentary, and volcaniclastic rocks, formed through the contemporaneous or alternating activity of volcanic processes and sedimentary deposition, commonly in tectonically active settings such as rifts or volcanic arcs. These successions typically include lava flows, pyroclastic deposits, sedimentary structures, and reworked volcaniclastic material, reflecting the coupled interaction between volcanism, erosion, transport, and sedimentation within evolving basins.
