= Felsic =

Igneous rock rich in silica and feldspar

In geology, felsic is a modifier describing igneous rocks that are relatively rich in elements that form feldspar and quartz. It is contrasted with mafic rocks, which are richer in magnesium and iron. Felsic refers to silicate minerals, magma, and rocks which are enriched in the lighter elements such as silicon, oxygen, aluminium, sodium, and potassium. Molten felsic magma and lava is more viscous than molten mafic magma and lava. Felsic magmas and lavas have lower temperatures of melting and solidification than mafic magmas and lavas.

Felsic rocks are usually light in color and have specific gravities less than 3. The most common felsic rock is granite. Common felsic minerals include quartz, muscovite, orthoclase, and the sodium-rich plagioclase feldspars (albite-rich).

== Terminology ==
=== Acid rock ===
In modern usage, the term acid rock, although sometimes used as a synonym, normally now refers specifically to a high-silica-content (greater than 63% SiO_{2} by weight) volcanic rock, such as rhyolite. Older, broader usage is now considered archaic. That usage, with the contrasting term "basic rock" (MgO, FeO, mafic), was based on an ancient concept, dating from the 19th century, that "silicic acid" (H_{4}SiO_{4} or Si(OH)_{4}) was the chief form of silicon occurring in siliceous rocks. Although this intuition makes sense from an acid-base perspective in aquatic chemistry considering water-rock interactions and silica dissolution, siliceous rocks are not formed by this protonated monomeric species, but by a three-dimensional network of SiO^{4−}_{4} tetrahedra connected to each other. Once released in water and hydrolyzed, these silica entities can indeed form silicic acid in aqueous solution.

=== Etymology ===
The term "felsic" is a derivation of the words "feldspar" and "silica". The similarity of the resulting term felsic to the German felsig, "rocky" (from Fels, "rock"), is accidental. Feldspar is from the German Feldspat, a compound of the German Feld, meaning field, plus spat[h], meaning mineral.

== Classification of felsic rocks ==
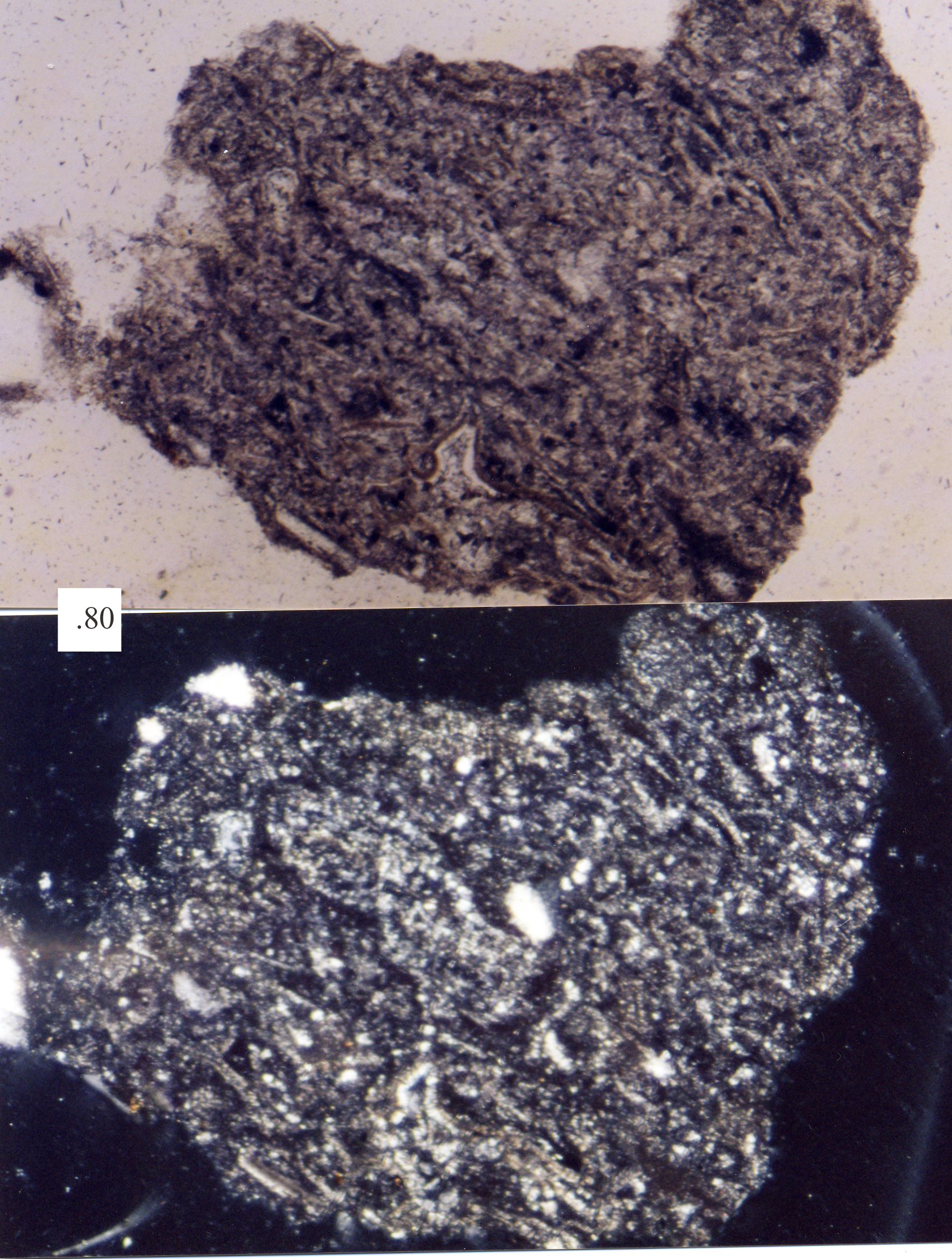
A felsic volcanic lithic fragment, as seen in a petrographic microscope. Scale box is in millimeters.

In order for a rock (rather than a mineral) to be classified as felsic, it generally needs to contain more than 75% felsic minerals (namely quartz, orthoclase and plagioclase). Rocks with greater than 90% felsic minerals can also be called leucocratic, from the Greek words for white and dominance.

Felsite is a petrologic field term used to refer to very fine-grained or aphanitic, light-colored volcanic rocks which might be later reclassified after a more detailed microscopic or chemical analysis.

In some cases, felsic volcanic rocks may contain phenocrysts of mafic minerals, usually hornblende, pyroxene or a feldspar mineral, and may need to be named after their phenocryst mineral, such as 'hornblende-bearing felsite'.

The chemical name of a felsic rock is given according to the TAS classification of Le Maitre (1975). However, this only applies to volcanic rocks. If the rock is analyzed and found to be felsic but is metamorphic and has no definite volcanic protolith, it may be sufficient to simply call it a 'felsic schist'. There are examples known of highly sheared granites which can be mistaken for rhyolites.

For phaneritic felsic rocks, the QAPF diagram should be used, and a name given according to the granite nomenclature. Often the species of mafic minerals is included in the name, for instance, hornblende-bearing granite, pyroxene tonalite or augite megacrystic monzonite, because the term "granite" already assumes content with feldspar and quartz.

The rock texture thus determines the basic name of a felsic rock.

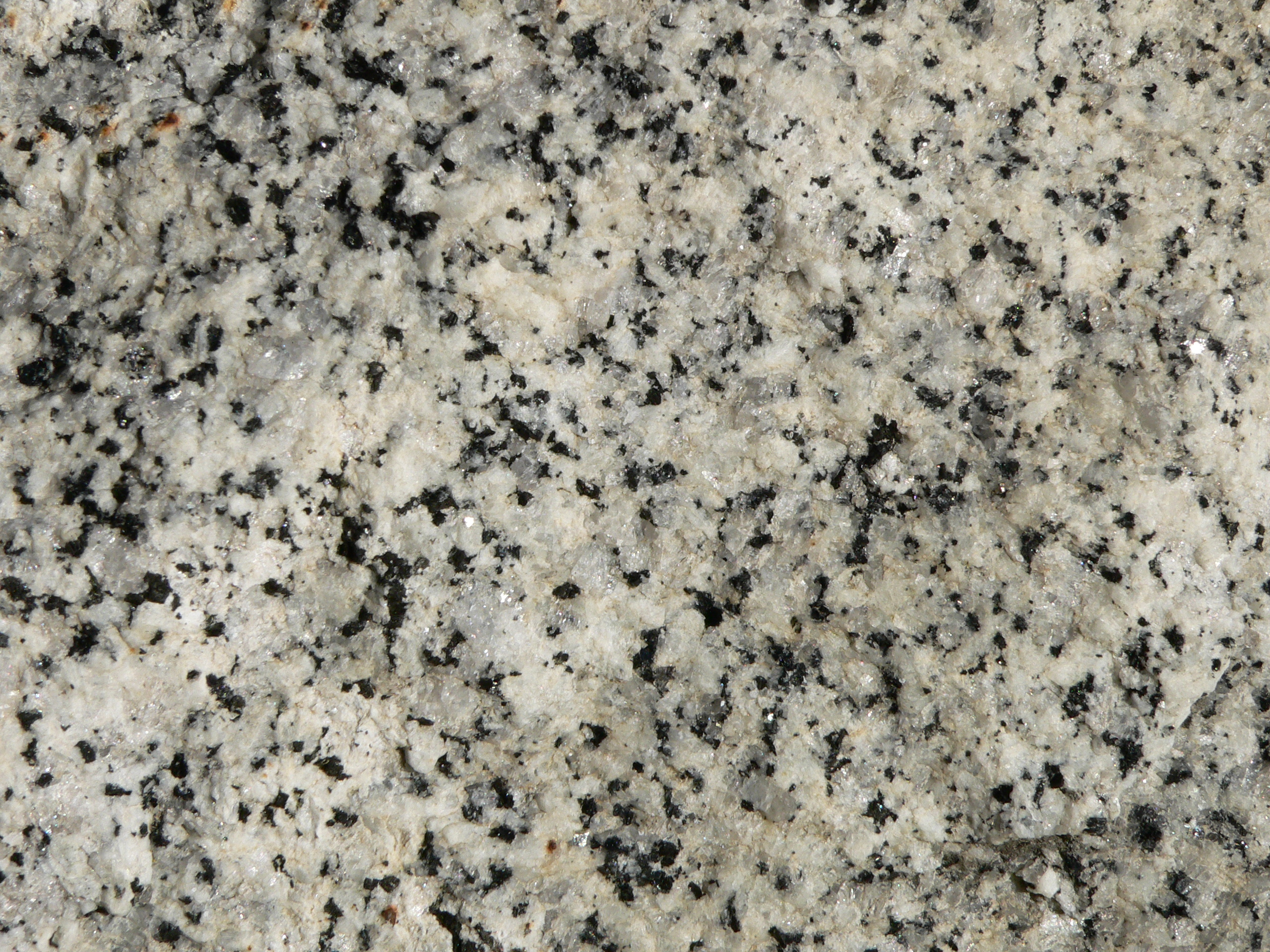
Close-up of granite from Yosemite National Park.

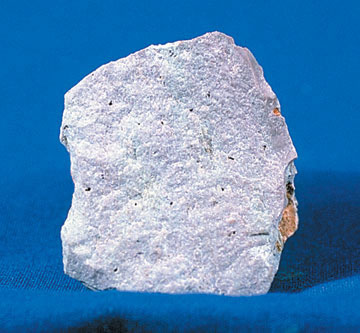
A specimen of rhyolite.

Rock texture	Name of felsic rock
Pegmatitic	Granite pegmatite
Coarse-grained (phaneritic)	Granite
Coarse-grained and porphyritic	Porphyritic granite
Fine-grained (aphanitic)	Rhyolite
Fine-grained and porphyritic	Porphyritic rhyolite
Pyroclastic	Rhyolitic tuff or breccia
Vesicular	Pumice
Amygdaloidal	None
Vitreous (Glassy)	Obsidian or porcellanite

== See also ==
- QAPF diagram
- List of minerals
- List of rock types
- Bowen's reaction series
- Archean felsic volcanic rocks
