= Onverwacht Group =

Volcanic rock formations in South Africa

- Stratigraphic range: Paleoarchean >3300 Ma
- Type: Geological group
- Sub-units: Subunits
- Underlies: Fig Tree Formation
- Thickness: 16,370 m (53,710 ft)

Lithology
- Primary: Greenstone belt
- Other: Volcanic rock

Location
- Coordinates: 25.8°S 31.0°E
- Region: Barberton Greenstone Belt, Mpumalanga
- Country: South Africa, Eswatini
- Extent: Kaapvaal craton
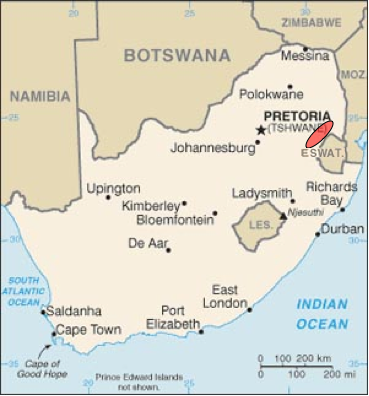
- Location of the Barberton Greenstone Belt

The Onverwacht Group or Onverwacht Series is a series of greenstone belts and volcanic rock formations from the Archean Eon in the Kaapvaal craton in South Africa and Eswatini.

A well known part of the Onverwacht Series is visible in the Komati valley, located in the east of the Transvaal region.

== Subdivision ==
The Onverwacht Group can be divided into two subgroups with six formations:

- Geluk Subgroup
  - Swartkoppie Formation – 920 metres (3,020 ft)
  - Kromberg Formation – 1,920 metres (6,300 ft)
  - Hooggenoeg Formation – 4,850 metres (15,910 ft)
- Tjakastad Subgroup
  - Komatii Formation – 3,500 metres (11,500 ft)
  - Theespruit Formation – 1,980 metres (6,500 ft)
  - Sandspruit Formation – 3,200 metres (10,500 ft)

The fossils found in the Onverwacht Series are among the oldest found on Earth.

== See also ==
- Archean life in the Barberton Greenstone Belt
- Warrawoona Group
