= Moodies Group =

Geological formation in South Africa and Eswatini

- Stratigraphic range: Paleoarchean; ~3220 Ma
- Type: Geological group
- Overlies: Fig Tree Formation

Lithology
- Primary: Greenstone belt
- Other: Sedimentary Rock

Location
- Coordinates: 25.8°S 31.0°E
- Region: Barberton Greenstone Belt, Mpumalanga
- Country: South Africa, Eswatini
- Extent: Kaapvaal craton
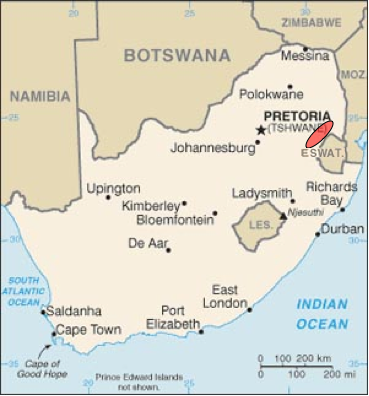
- Location of the Barberton Greenstone Belt

The Moodies Group is a geological formation in South Africa and Eswatini. It has the oldest well-preserved siliciclastic tidal deposits on Earth, where microbial mats flourished.

== See also ==
- Archean life in the Barberton Greenstone Belt
- Fig Tree Formation
- Onverwacht Group
