= Fig Tree Formation =

Stromatolite-containing geological formation in South Africa

- Stratigraphic range: Paleoarchean; ~3280–3220 Ma
- Type: Geological formation
- Unit of: Barberton Supergroup
- Underlies: Moodies Group
- Overlies: Onverwacht Group

Lithology
- Primary: Sandstone
- Other: Shale

Location
- Location: Kaapvaal craton
- Coordinates: 25.8°S 31.0°E
- Region: Barberton Greenstone Belt, Mpumalanga
- Country: South Africa
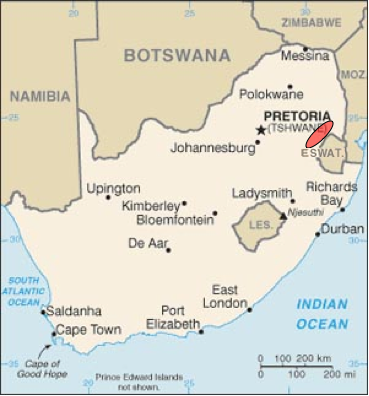
- Location of the Barberton Greenstone Belt

The Fig Tree Formation, also called Fig Tree Group, is a stromatolite-containing geological formation in South Africa dated to around 3.28–3.22 Ga. The rock contains fossils of microscopic life forms that are about 3.26 billion years old. Identified organisms include the bacterium Eobacterium isolatum and the algae-like Archaeosphaeroides barbertonensis. The fossils in the Fig Tree Formation are considered some of the oldest known organisms on Earth, and provide evidence that life may have existed much earlier than previously thought. The formation is composed of shales, turbiditic greywackes, volcaniclastic sandstones, chert, turbiditic siltstone, conglomerate, breccias, mudstones, and iron-rich shales.

== Meteorite impact ==
This formation also contains evidence of the biggest known meteorite impact on Earth.

== See also ==
- Archean life in the Barberton Greenstone Belt
- Warrawoona Group
