= Eobacterium =

Eobacterium Temporal range: Paleoarchean, ~3277–3225 Ma

Scientific classification
- Domain: Bacteria
- Kingdom: incertae sedis
- Genus: †Eobacterium; Barghoorn and Schopf, 1966
- Species: †E. isolatum

Binomial name
- †Eobacterium isolatum Barghoorn and Schopf, 1966

Extinct genus of probable bacteria

Eobacterium is a fossil genus of probable bacteria from the Fig Tree Formation in South Africa. It lived during the Paleoarchean era, around 3.277–3.225 Ga, making it one of the oldest known organisms if it is valid. The discovery of Eobacterium and other Fig Tree organisms such as Archaeosphaeroides in the 1960s helped prove that life existed over three billion years ago.

The genus is monospecific, and contains one species, Eobacterium isolatum.
