= Komatii Formation =

3.475 billion year old rock formation in South Africa

Komati Formation
- Stratigraphic range: Paleoarchean; 3300 Ma
- Type: Geological formation
- Unit of: Onverwacht Group; Tjakastad Subgroup
- Underlies: Geluk Subgroup; Hooggenoeg Formation
- Overlies: Theespruit Formation
- Thickness: 3,500 m (11,500 ft)

Lithology
- Primary: Komatiite
- Other: Tholeiitic basalt

Location
- Coordinates: 25.8°S 31.0°E
- Region: Barberton Greenstone Belt, Mpumalanga
- Country: South Africa
- Extent: Kaapvaal craton

Type section
- Named for: Komati River
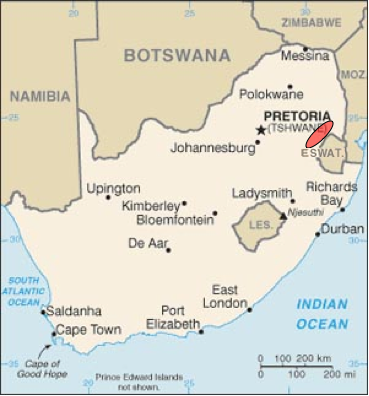
- Location of the Barberton Greenstone Belt

The Komati Formation, also named as Komatii Formation, is a 3.475 billion year old Paleoarchean rock formation, named after the nearby Komati River in South Africa. It is the type locality for komatiite, a high temperature, magnesium-rich volcanic rock occurring in the Barberton Greenstone Belt, Mpumalanga.

== Description ==
The formation, belonging to the Tjakastad Subgroup of the Onverwacht Group, overlies the Theespruit Formation and is overlain by the Hooggenoeg Formation of the Geluk Subgroup. Komatiites and tholeiites from the Komati Formation were analyzed for sulfur and provided δ34S values between −0.7 and 5.2 ‰.

The Komatii Formation comprises metamorphosed komatiites and basaltic komatiites, with minor mafic lavas and small intrusions. The lower part of the Komatii Formation is dominantly ultramafic, while the upper part is dominantly mafic.
