= Archaeosphaeroides =

Archaeosphaeroides Temporal range: Paleoarchean, ~3481–3225 Ma

Scientific classification
- Domain: Bacteria
- Kingdom: Bacillati
- Phylum: Cyanobacteriota
- Class: incertae sedis
- Genus: †Archaeosphaeroides; Schopf and Barghoorn, 1967

Type species
- †Archaeosphaeroides barbertonensis Schopf and Barghoorn, 1967

Other species
- †Archaeosphaeroides pilbarensis Schopf, 1983

Extinct genus of bacteria

Archaeosphaeroides is a fossil genus of probable coccoid cyanobacterium known from microfossils discovered in the Fig Tree Group of South Africa, as well as the Warrawoona Group of Western Australia. It lived during the Paleoarchean era, around 3.481–3.225 Ga.

It contains two species, A. barbertonensis (the type species) and A. pilbarensis.
