= Geology of Lesotho =

The geology of Lesotho is built on ancient crystalline basement rock up to 3.6 billion years old, belonging to the Kaapvaal craton, a section of stable primordial crust. Most of the rocks in the country are sedimentary or volcanic units, belonging to the Karoo Supergroup. The country is notable for large fossil deposits and intense erosion due to high rainfall and a rare case of southern African glaciation during the last ice age. Lesotho has extensive diamonds and other natural resources and has the highest concentration of kimberlite pipes anywhere in the world.

== Stratigraphy and geologic history ==
Lesotho shares many commonalities with the geology of South Africa, with Kaapvaal craton crystalline basement rock that formed 3.6 to 2.5 billion years ago. Geologists have gleaned insights into Lesotho's deep past through extrapolation from South Africa, xenoliths extracted from kimberlite pipes and other data from drilling. Above the ancient basement rocks, almost all of the rocks in Lesotho are part of the Karoo Supergroup, the most widespread stratigraphic unit in southern Africa.

The Karoo Supergroup began to form 510 million years ago in a rift valley in the south of the supercontinent Gondwana, spanning into what is now southern South America. The Burgersdorp Formation is the top unit of the Beaufort Group and the oldest Karoo-related unit in Lesotho, with red and maroon sandstones interspersed with thin coal seams. The Stormberg Group is divided between the Molteno Formation, Elliot Formation and Clarens Formation. The Molteno Formation is 15 to 300 meters thick and records a Late Triassic lake bed environment, with abundant plant and insect fossils. There is an unconformity between the Molteno and the overlying 70 to 250 meter thick sandstones, mudstones and siltstones of the Elliot Formation, which contains silicified wood and dinosaur fossils. The 15 to 250 meter thick Clarens Formation lies atop the Elliot Formation and has sandstones, siltstones and thin bands of chert.

The Early Jurassic, amygdale enriched volcanic rocks of the Lesotho Formation (part of the Drakensberg Group) cap the sedimentary sequence and form Lesotho's mountain tops, with a 1.6 kilometer thick layer. For the most part, the Lesotho Formation is basalt that cooled from a tholeiitic magma series. The numerous layers of ropy plateau basalt are intruded by 70 volcanic vents and over 1000 dikes and sills. Kimberlite pipes may have formed during eruptions in the Cretaceous marking an end to volcanic activity.

In the Cenozoic Lesotho experienced high rainfall and was one of the few places in southern Africa glaciated during the Pleistocene. As a result, extreme erosion formed cobble beds with sand and clay layers in lower elevation valleys, with material up to 20 meters thick. Donga is a local term for the steep-sided ravines common in Lesotho that formed in this material.

== Structural geology and tectonics ==
Lesotho forms a syncline within the larger southern African Karoo Basin and the sediments of the Karoo Supergroup were influenced by deformation at three different times before, during and after the formation of the Drakensberg mountains. The Hellspoort fault is the only large fault in the country, running northeast–southwest with a vertical displacement of 300 meters near Mafeteng, although there are other smaller faults.

== Hydrogeology ==
More than 50% of Lesotho's territory is underlain by fractured igneous rock aquifers, such as the low permeability basalt of the Lesotho Formation. Dolerite-dike related aquifers have high water productivity in fractures that formed in the surrounding rock due to the high temperature of the intrusion. The sandstones of the Clarens Formation, Elliot Formation and Burgersdorp Formation are small or low quality aquifers, but the Molteno Formation is regarded as the best aquifer in Lesotho with high yield and frequent springs. Steep terrain, rain and snow melt mean that Lesotho has a high risk of landslides.

== Natural resource geology ==
Lesotho has extensive diamond deposits in both kimberlites and alluvial gravel. The country has the highest concentration of kimberlite bodies in the world—a total of more than 400, including 343 dikes, 39 pipes and 23 blows. Northern Lesotho has an average of one kimberlite body for every 10 square kilometers. In spite of the large deposits, very few sites are mined and research is ongoing into alluvial deposits. The Karoo Supergroup hosts low-grade uranium and likely coal and coal-bed methane, although the Lower Karoo which hosts the coal seams does not outcrop in Lesotho. The country has quarrying of Quaternary clay deposits, Drakensberg Group fine-grained basalts and sandstones in the Elliot, Molteno and Clarens Formations.
