= History of Earth =

Records of Earth's development

Earth's history with time-spans of the eons to scale. Ma means "million years ago", Ga means "billion years ago".

The natural history of Earth concerns the development of planet Earth from its formation to the present day. Nearly all branches of natural science have contributed to the understanding of the main events of Earth's past, characterized by constant geological change and biological evolution.

The geological time scale (GTS), as defined by international convention, depicts the large spans of time from the beginning of Earth to the present, and its divisions chronicle some definitive events of Earth history. Earth formed around 4.54 billion years ago, approximately one-third the age of the universe, by accretion from the solar nebula. Volcanic outgassing probably created the primordial atmosphere and then the ocean, but the early atmosphere contained almost no oxygen. Much of Earth was molten because of frequent collisions with other bodies which led to extreme volcanism. While Earth was in its earliest stage (Early Earth), a giant impact collision with a planet-sized body named Theia is thought to have formed the Moon. Over time, Earth cooled, causing the formation of a solid crust, and allowing liquid water on the surface.

The Hadean eon represents the time before a reliable (fossil) record of life. It began with the formation of the planet and ended about 4.03 billion years ago. The following Archean and Proterozoic eons produced the beginnings of life on Earth and its earliest evolution. The succeeding eon is the Phanerozoic, divided into three eras: the Palaeozoic, an era of arthropods, fishes, and the first life on land; the Mesozoic, which spanned the rise, reign, and climactic extinction of the non-avian dinosaurs; and the Cenozoic, which saw the rise of mammals. Recognizable humans emerged at most 2 million years ago, a vanishingly small period on the geological scale.

The earliest undisputed evidence of life on Earth dates at least from 3.5 billion years ago, during the Eoarchean Era, after a geological crust started to solidify following the earlier molten Hadean eon. There are microbial mat fossils such as stromatolites found in 3.48 billion-year-old sandstone discovered in Western Australia. Other early physical evidence of a biogenic substance is graphite in 3.7 billion-year-old metasedimentary rocks discovered in southwestern Greenland as well as "remains of biotic life" found in 4.1 billion-year-old rocks in Western Australia. According to one of the researchers, "If life arose relatively quickly on Earth … then it could be common in the universe."

Photosynthetic organisms appeared between 3.2 and 2.4 billion years ago and began enriching the atmosphere with oxygen. Life remained mostly small and microscopic until about 580 million years ago, when complex multicellular life arose, developed over time, and culminated in the Cambrian Explosion about 538.8 million years ago. This sudden diversification of life forms produced most of the major phyla known today, and divided the Proterozoic Eon from the Cambrian Period of the Paleozoic Era. It is estimated that 99 percent of all species that ever lived on Earth, over five billion, have gone extinct. Estimates on the number of Earth's current species range from 10 million to 14 million, of which about 1.2 million are documented, but over 86 percent have not been described.

Earth's crust has constantly changed since its formation, as has life since its first appearance. Species continue to evolve, taking on new forms, splitting into daughter species, or going extinct in the face of ever-changing physical environments. The process of plate tectonics continues to shape Earth's continents and oceans and the life they harbor.

== Eons ==
In geochronology, time is generally measured in Ma (million years ago), each unit representing the period of approximately 1,000,000 years in the past. The history of Earth is divided into four great eons, starting 4,540 Ma with the formation of the planet. Each eon saw the most significant changes in Earth's composition, climate and life. Each eon is subsequently divided into eras, which in turn are divided into periods, which are further divided into epochs.

Eon	Time (mya)	Description
Hadean	4,540–4,031	Earth is formed out of debris around the solar protoplanetary disk. There is no life. Temperatures are extremely hot, with frequent volcanic activity and hellish-looking environments (hence the eon's name, which comes from Hades). The atmosphere is nebular. Possible early oceans or bodies of liquid water. The Moon is formed around this time probably due to a protoplanet's collision into Earth.
Archean	4,031–2,500	Prokaryote life, the first form of life, emerges at the very beginning of this eon, in a process known as abiogenesis. The continents of Ur, Vaalbara and Kenorland may have existed around this time. The atmosphere is composed of volcanic and greenhouse gases.
Proterozoic	2,500–538.8	The name of this eon means "early life". Eukaryotes, a more complex form of life, emerge, including some forms of multicellular organisms. Bacteria begin producing oxygen, shaping the third and current of Earth's atmospheres. Photosynthetic eukaryotes, including algae, diversify during this eon, and animals appear before its end. The early and late phases of this eon may have undergone "Snowball Earth" periods, in which all of the planet experienced below-zero temperatures. The early continents of Columbia, Rodinia and Pannotia, in that order, may have existed in this eon.
Phanerozoic	538.8–present	Complex life, including vertebrates, begin to dominate Earth's ocean in a process known as the Cambrian explosion. Pangaea forms and later dissolves into Laurasia and Gondwana, which in turn dissolve into the current continents. Gradually, life expands to land and familiar forms of land plants, animals and fungi begin appearing, including annelids, insects and reptiles, hence the eon's name, which means "visible life". Several mass extinctions occur, among which birds, the descendants of non-avian dinosaurs, and more recently mammals emerge. Modern animals—including humans—evolve at the most recent phases of this eon.

== Geologic time scale ==
The history of Earth can be organized chronologically according to the geologic time scale, which is split into intervals based on stratigraphic analysis.

The following five timelines show the geologic time scale to scale. The first shows the entire time from the formation of Earth to the present, but this gives little space for the most recent eon. The second timeline shows an expanded view of the most recent eon. In a similar way, the most recent era is expanded in the third timeline, the most recent period is expanded in the fourth timeline, and the most recent epoch is expanded in the fifth timeline.

(Horizontal scale is millions of years for the above timelines; thousands of years for the timeline below)

== Solar System formation ==
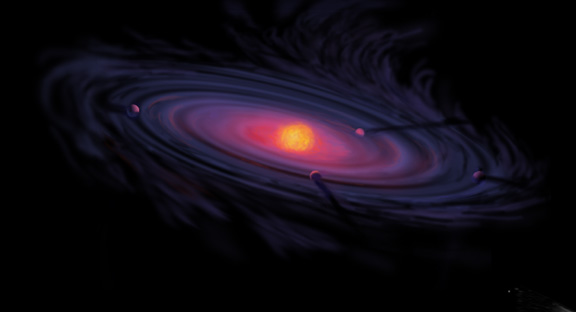
An artist's rendering of a protoplanetary disk

The standard model for the formation of the Solar System (including Earth) is the solar nebula hypothesis. In this model, the Solar System formed from a large, rotating cloud of interstellar dust and gas called the solar nebula. It was composed of hydrogen and helium created shortly after the Big Bang 13.8 Ga (billion years ago) and heavier elements ejected by supernovae. About 4.5 Ga, the nebula began a contraction that may have been triggered by the shock wave from a nearby supernova. A shock wave would have also made the nebula rotate. As the cloud began to accelerate, its angular momentum, gravity, and inertia flattened it into a protoplanetary disk perpendicular to its axis of rotation. Small perturbations due to collisions and the angular momentum of other large debris created the means by which kilometer-sized protoplanets began to form, orbiting the nebular center.

The center of the nebula, not having much angular momentum, collapsed rapidly, the compression heating it until nuclear fusion of hydrogen into helium began. After more contraction, a T Tauri star ignited and evolved into the Sun. Meanwhile, in the outer part of the nebula gravity caused matter to condense around density perturbations and dust particles, and the rest of the protoplanetary disk began separating into rings. In a process known as runaway accretion, successively larger fragments of dust and debris clumped together to form planets. Earth formed in this manner about 4.54 Ga (with an uncertainty of 1%) and was largely completed within 10–20 million years. In June 2023, scientists reported evidence that the planet Earth may have formed in just three million years, much faster than the 10−100 million years thought earlier. Nonetheless, the solar wind of the newly formed T Tauri star cleared out most of the material in the disk that had not already condensed into larger bodies. The same process is expected to produce accretion disks around virtually all newly forming stars in the universe, some of which yield planets.

The proto-Earth grew by accretion until its interior was hot enough to melt the heavy, siderophile metals. Having higher densities than the silicates, these metals sank. This so-called iron catastrophe resulted in the separation of a primitive mantle and a (metallic) core only 10 million years after Earth began to form, producing the layered structure of Earth and setting up the formation of Earth's magnetic field. J.A. Jacobs was the first to suggest that Earth's inner core—a solid center distinct from the liquid outer core—is freezing and growing out of the liquid outer core due to the gradual cooling of Earth's interior (about 100 degrees Celsius per billion years).

== Hadean and Archean Eons ==
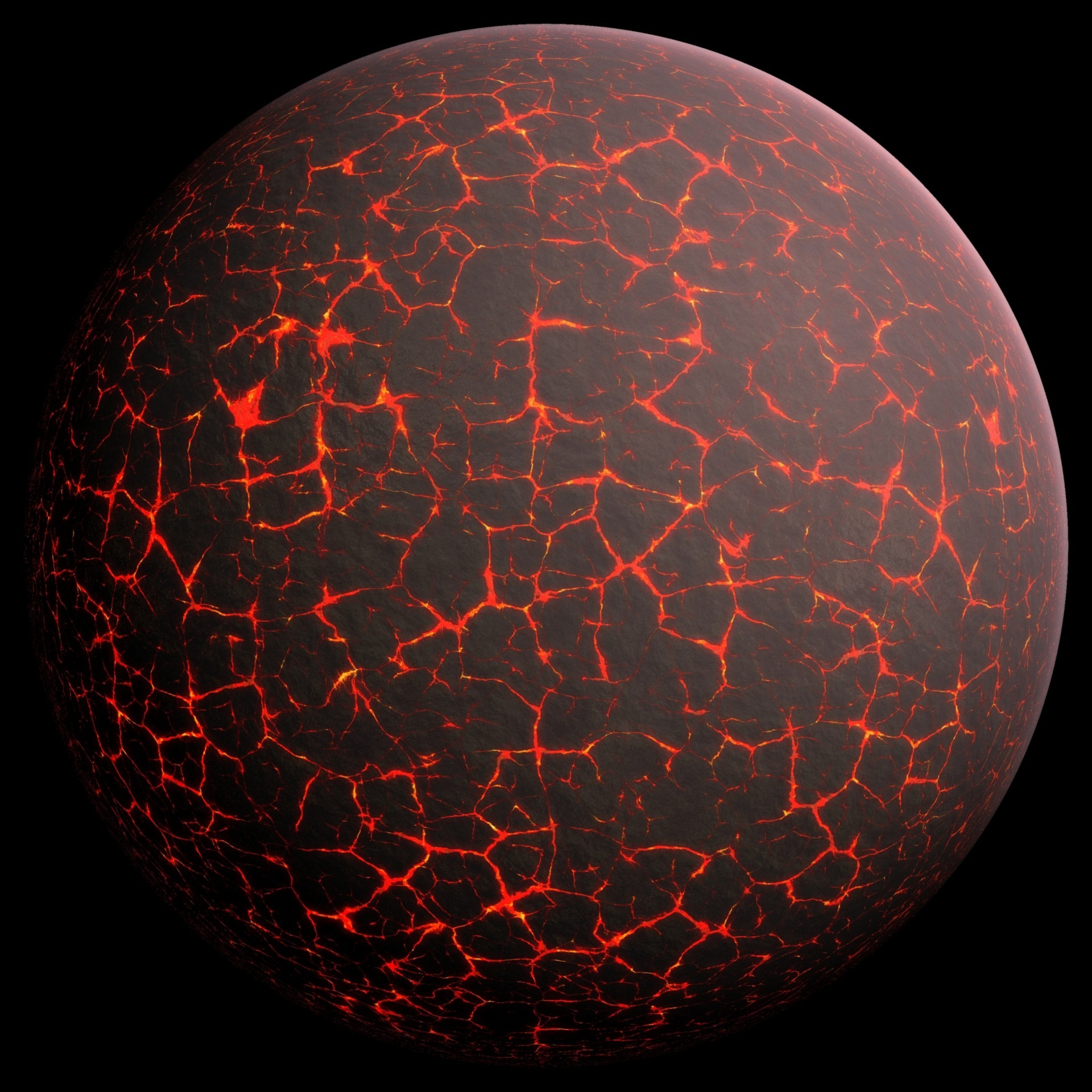
Artist's conception of Hadean Eon Earth, when it was much hotter and inhospitable to all forms of life.

The first eon in Earth's history, the Hadean, begins with Earth's formation and is followed by the Archean eon at 4.031 ± 0.003 Ga. The oldest rocks found on Earth date to about 4.0 Ga, and the oldest detrital zircon crystals in rocks to about 4.4 Ga, soon after the formation of Earth's crust and Earth itself. The giant impact hypothesis for the Moon's formation states that shortly after formation of an initial crust, the proto-Earth was impacted by a smaller protoplanet, which ejected part of the mantle and crust into space and created the Moon.

From crater counts on other celestial bodies, it is inferred that a period of intense meteorite impacts, called the Late Heavy Bombardment, began about 4.1 Ga and concluded around 3.8 Ga. In addition, volcanism was severe due to the large heat flow and geothermal gradient. Nevertheless, detrital zircon crystals dated to 4.4 Ga show evidence of having undergone contact with liquid water, suggesting that Earth already had oceans or seas at that time.

By the beginning of the Archean, Earth had cooled significantly. Present life forms could not have survived at Earth's surface, because the Archean atmosphere lacked oxygen hence had no ozone layer to block ultraviolet light. Nevertheless, it is believed that primordial life began to evolve by the early Archean, with candidate fossils dated to around 3.5 Ga. Some scientists even speculate that life could have begun during the early Hadean, as far back as 4.4 Ga, surviving the possible Late Heavy Bombardment period in hydrothermal vents below Earth's surface.

=== Formation of the Moon ===
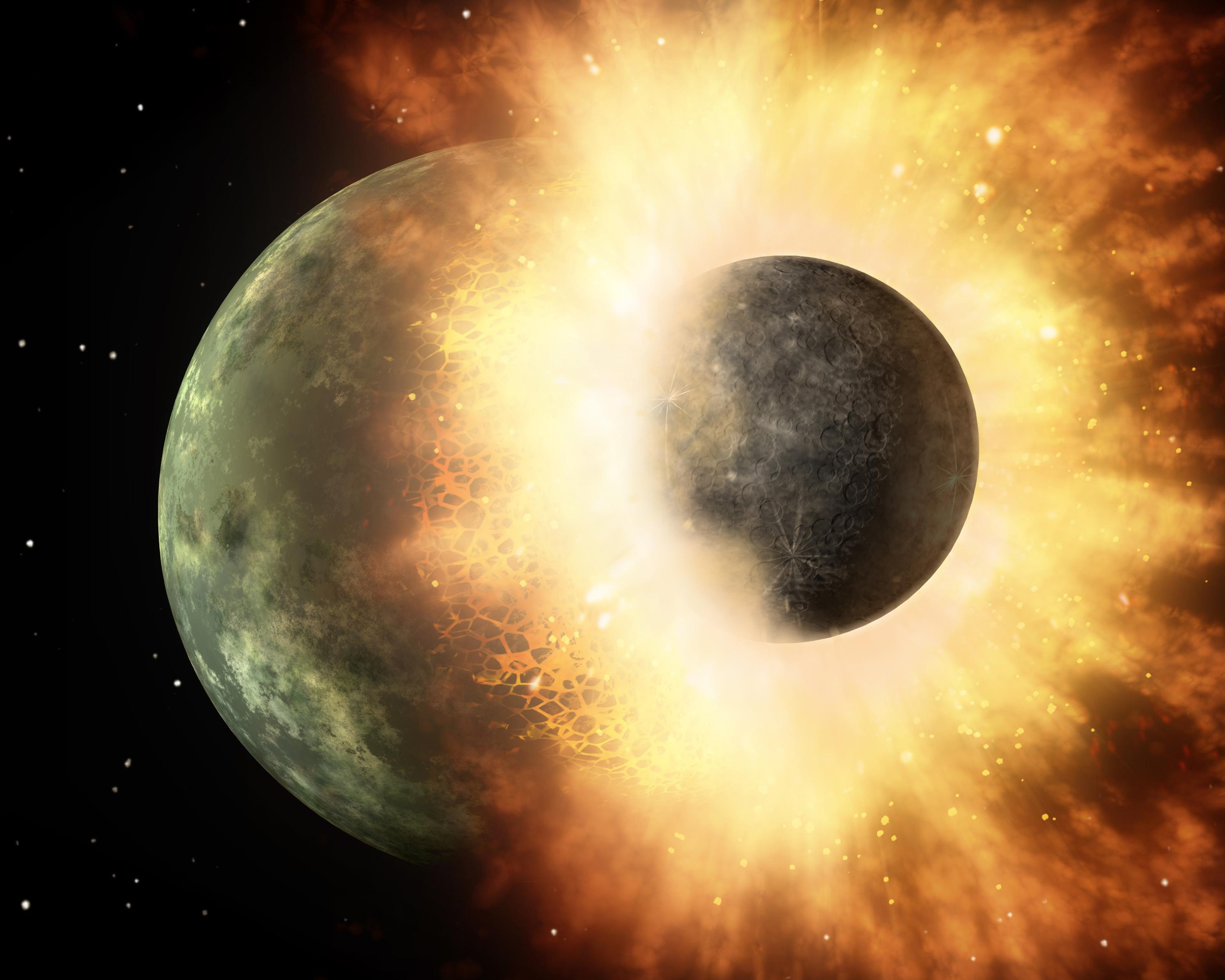
Artist's impression of the enormous collision that probably formed the Moon

Earth's only natural satellite, the Moon, is larger relative to its planet than any other satellite in the Solar System. (Note: Pluto's satellite Charon is relatively larger, but Pluto is defined as a dwarf planet.) During the Apollo program, rocks from the Moon's surface were brought to Earth. Radiometric dating of these rocks shows that the Moon is 4.53 ± 0.01 billion years old, formed at least 30 million years after the Solar System. New evidence suggests the Moon formed even later, 4.48 ± 0.02 Ga, or 70–110 million years after the start of the Solar System.

Theories for the formation of the Moon must explain its late formation as well as the following facts. First, the Moon has a low density (3.3 times that of water, compared to 5.5 for Earth) and a small metallic core. Second, Earth and Moon have the same oxygen isotopic signature (relative abundance of the oxygen isotopes). Of the theories proposed to account for these phenomena, one is widely accepted: The giant impact hypothesis proposes that the Moon originated after a body the size of Mars (sometimes named Theia) struck the proto-Earth a glancing blow.

The collision released about 100 million times more energy than the more recent Chicxulub impact that is believed to have caused the extinction of the non-avian dinosaurs. It was enough to vaporize some of Earth's outer layers and melt both bodies. A portion of the mantle material was ejected into orbit around Earth. The giant impact hypothesis predicts that the Moon was depleted of metallic material, explaining its abnormal composition. The ejecta in orbit around Earth could have condensed into a single body within a couple of weeks. Under the influence of its own gravity, the ejected material became a more spherical body: the Moon.

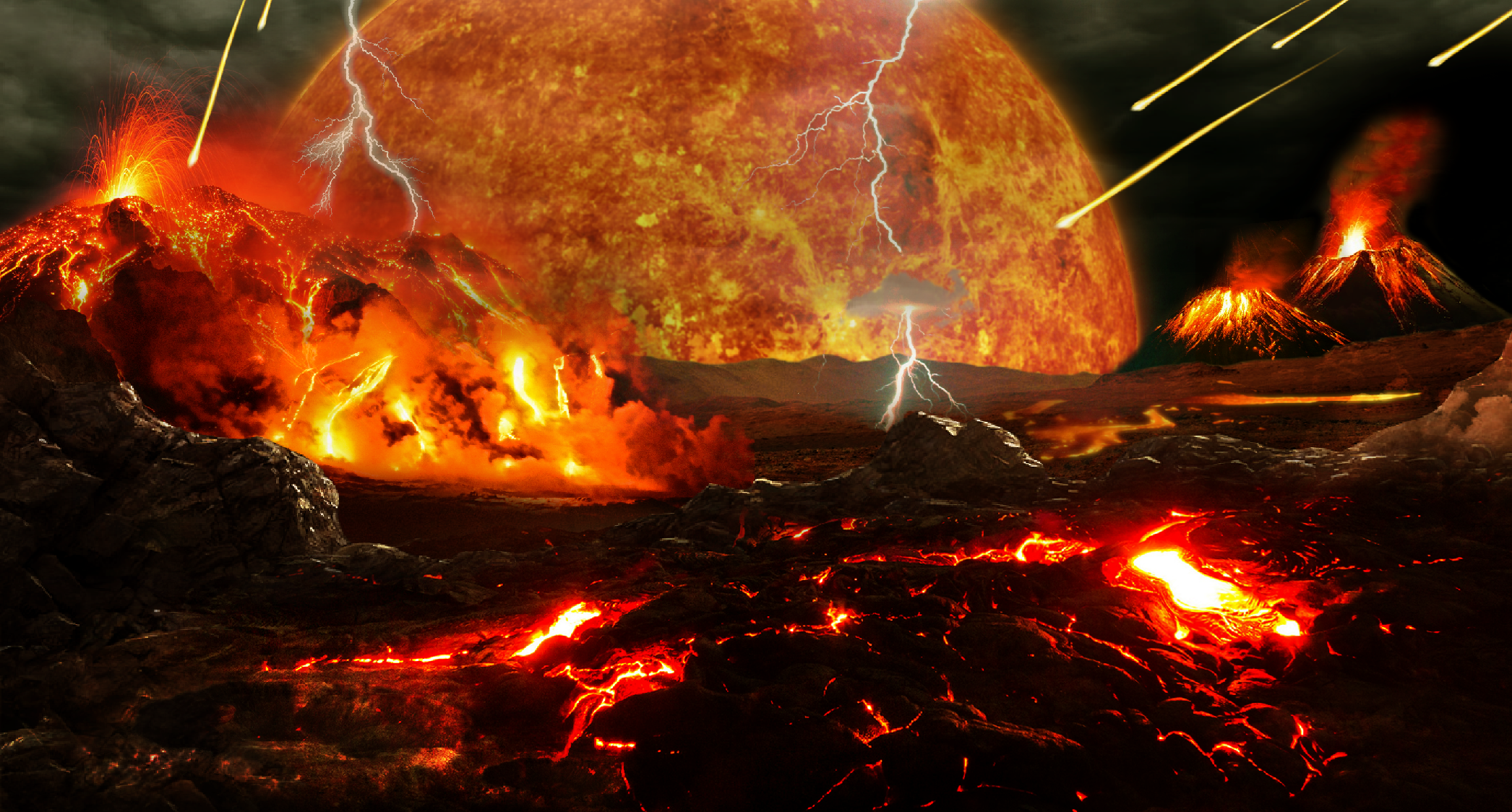
Artist's impression of a Hadean landscape with the relatively newly formed Moon still looming closely over Earth and both bodies sustaining strong volcanism.

=== First continents ===
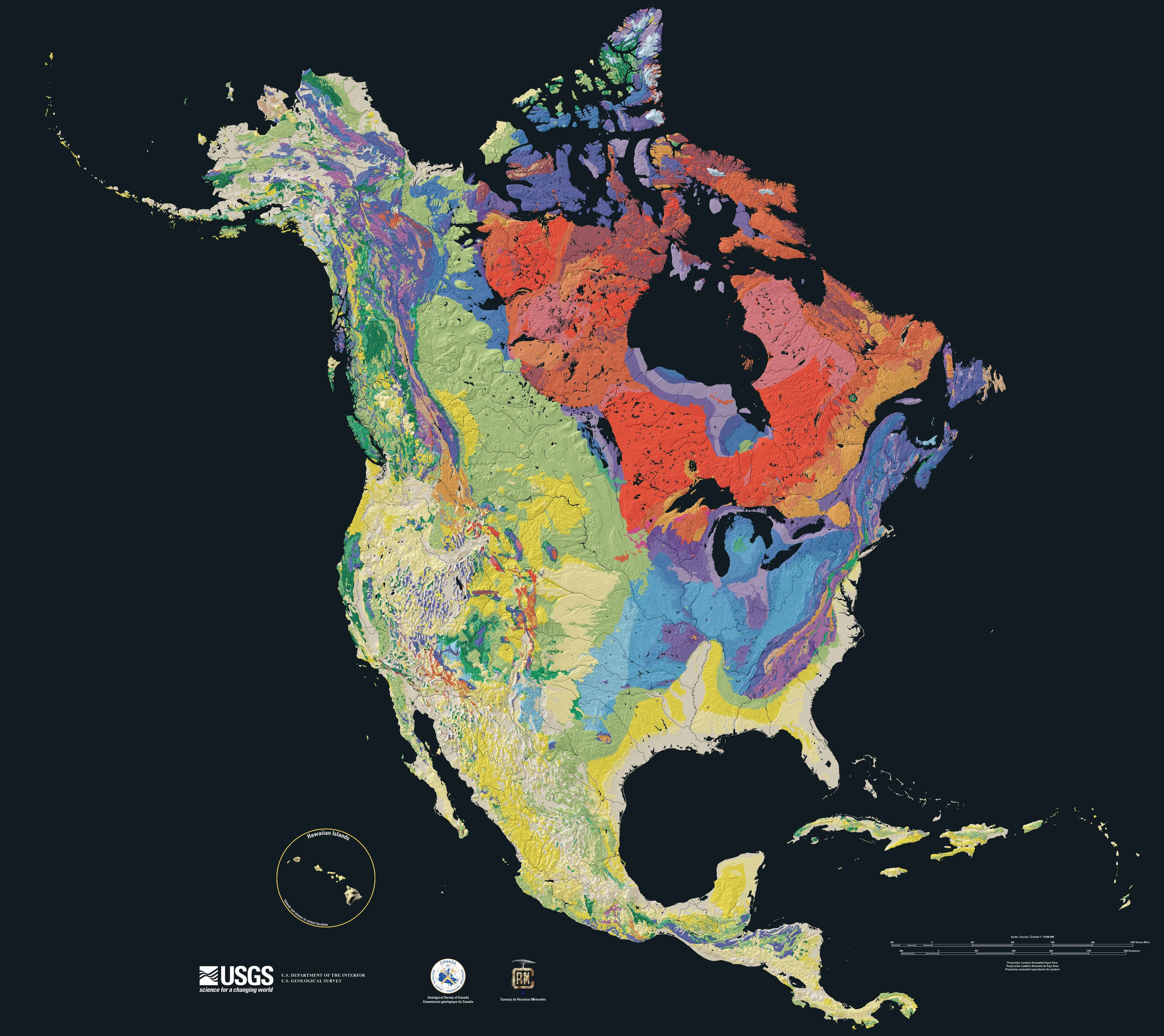
Geologic map of North America, color-coded by age. From most recent to oldest, age is indicated by yellow, green, blue, and red. The reds and pinks indicate rock from the Archean.

Plate tectonics is driven by mantle convection, the flow of heated rock from Earth's interior to the surface. The rising mantle extruded at mid-oceanic ridges builds up rigid tectonic plates, which are eventually shifted to subduction zones where they sink back into the mantle. During the early Archean (about 3.0 Ga) the mantle was probably around 1,600 °C (2,910 °F) hotter than today, so convection in the mantle was faster, leading to a faster tectonic process during the Hadean and Archean. Subduction zones were more common and tectonic plates smaller.

The initial crust, which formed when Earth's surface first solidified, totally disappeared from a combination of this fast Hadean plate tectonics and the intense impacts of the Late Heavy Bombardment. It is thought the original crust was basaltic like today's oceanic crust, because little crustal differentiation had yet taken place. The first larger pieces of continental crust, formed of lighter elements which float upward during partial melting in the lower crust, appeared at the end of the Hadean, about 4.0 Ga. What is left of these first small continents are called cratons; they form the cores around which today's continents grew.

The oldest rocks on Earth are found in the North American craton of Canada. They are tonalites from about 4.0 Ga. They show traces of metamorphism by high temperature, but also sedimentary grains that have been rounded by erosion during transport by water, showing that rivers and seas existed then. Cratons consist primarily of two alternating types of terranes. The first are so-called greenstone belts, consisting of low-grade metamorphosed sedimentary rocks. These "greenstones" are similar to the sediments today found in oceanic trenches, above subduction zones, suggesting the start of subduction during the Archean. The second type is a complex of felsic magmatic rocks, mostly tonalite, trondhjemite or granodiorite, similar to granite: such terranes are called TTG-terranes. TTG-complexes are seen as the relicts of the first continental crust, formed by partial melting in basalt.

=== Oceans and atmosphere ===
Earth is often described as having had three atmospheres. The first, captured from the solar nebula, was composed of light (atmophile) elements from the solar nebula, mostly hydrogen and helium. A combination of the solar wind and Earth's heat would have driven off this atmosphere, and today's atmosphere is depleted of these elements compared to cosmic abundances. After the impact which created the Moon, the molten Earth released volatile gases; and later more gases were released by volcanoes, completing a second atmosphere rich in greenhouse gases but poor in oxygen. Finally, the third atmosphere, rich in oxygen, emerged when bacteria began to produce oxygen about 2.8 Ga.

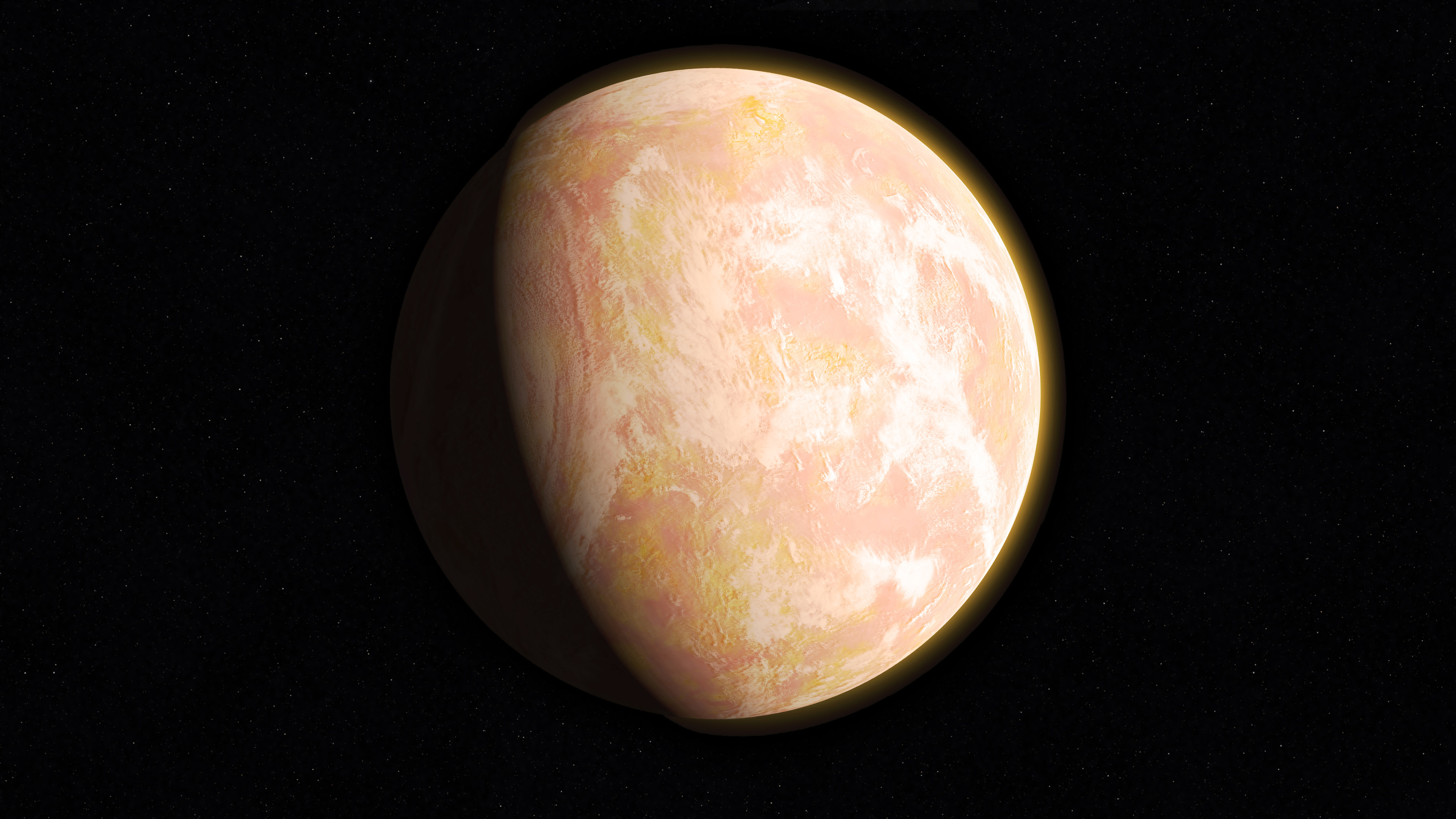
The pale orange dot, an artist's impression of the early Earth which might have appeared orange through its hazy methane rich prebiotic second atmosphere. Earth's atmosphere at this stage was somewhat comparable to today's atmosphere of Titan.

In early models for the formation of the atmosphere and ocean, the second atmosphere was formed by outgassing of volatiles from Earth's interior. Now it is considered likely that many of the volatiles were delivered during accretion by a process known as impact degassing in which incoming bodies vaporize on impact. The ocean and atmosphere would, therefore, have started to form even as Earth formed. The new atmosphere probably contained water vapor, carbon dioxide, nitrogen, and smaller amounts of other gases.

Planetesimals at a distance of 1 astronomical unit (AU), the distance of Earth from the Sun, probably did not contribute any water to Earth because the solar nebula was too hot for ice to form and the hydration of rocks by water vapor would have taken too long. The water must have been supplied by meteorites from the outer asteroid belt and some large planetary embryos from beyond 2.5 AU. Comets may also have contributed. Though most comets are today in orbits farther away from the Sun than Neptune, computer simulations show that they were originally far more common in the inner parts of the Solar System.

As Earth cooled, clouds formed. Rain created the oceans. Recent evidence suggests the oceans may have begun forming as early as 4.4 Ga. By the start of the Archean eon, they already covered much of Earth. This early formation has been difficult to explain because of a problem known as the faint young Sun paradox. Stars are known to get brighter as they age, and the Sun has become 30% brighter since its formation 4.5 billion years ago. Many models indicate that the early Earth should have been covered in ice. A likely solution is that there was enough carbon dioxide and methane to produce a greenhouse effect. The carbon dioxide would have been produced by volcanoes and the methane by early microbes. It is hypothesized that there also existed an organic haze created from the products of methane photolysis that caused an anti-greenhouse effect as well. Another greenhouse gas, ammonia, would have been ejected by volcanos but quickly destroyed by ultraviolet radiation.

=== Origin of life ===
Life timeline
← / Earth formed; ← / Earliest water; ← / LUCA; ← / Earliest fossils; ← / Great Oxygenation Event; ← / Sexual reproduction; ← / Earliest fungi; ← / Neoproterozoic oxygenation event; ← / Ediacaran biota; ← / Cambrian explosion; ← / Earliest tetrapods; ← / Earliest hominoid
(million years ago)

One of the reasons for interest in the early atmosphere and ocean is that they form the conditions under which life first arose. There are many models, but little consensus, on how life emerged from non-living chemicals; chemical systems created in the laboratory fall well short of the minimum complexity for a living organism.

The first step in the emergence of life may have been chemical reactions that produced many of the simpler organic compounds, including nucleobases and amino acids, that are the building blocks of life. An experiment in 1952 by Stanley Miller and Harold Urey showed that such molecules could form in an atmosphere of water, methane, ammonia and hydrogen with the aid of sparks to mimic the effect of lightning. Although atmospheric composition was probably different from that used by Miller and Urey, later experiments with more realistic compositions also managed to synthesize organic molecules. Computer simulations show that extraterrestrial organic molecules could have formed in the protoplanetary disk before the formation of Earth.

Additional complexity could have been reached from at least three possible starting points: self-replication, an organism's ability to produce offspring that are similar to itself; metabolism, its ability to feed and repair itself; and external cell membranes, which allow food to enter and waste products to leave, but exclude unwanted substances.

==== Replication first: RNA world ====
Even the simplest members of the three modern domains of life use DNA to record their "recipes" and a complex array of RNA and protein molecules to "read" these instructions and use them for growth, maintenance, and self-replication.

The discovery that a kind of RNA molecule called a ribozyme can catalyze both its own replication and the construction of proteins led to the hypothesis that earlier life-forms were based entirely on RNA. They could have formed an RNA world in which there were individuals but no species, as mutations and horizontal gene transfers would have meant that the offspring in each generation were quite likely to have different genomes from those that their parents started with. RNA would later have been replaced by DNA, which is more stable and therefore can build longer genomes, expanding the range of capabilities a single organism can have. Ribozymes remain as the main components of ribosomes, the "protein factories" of modern cells.

Although short, self-replicating RNA molecules have been artificially produced in laboratories, doubts have been raised about whether natural non-biological synthesis of RNA is possible. The earliest ribozymes may have been formed of simpler nucleic acids such as PNA, TNA or GNA, which would have been replaced later by RNA. Other pre-RNA replicators have been posited, including crystals and even quantum systems.

In 2003 it was proposed that porous metal sulfide precipitates would assist RNA synthesis at about 100 °C (212 °F) and at ocean-bottom pressures near hydrothermal vents. In this hypothesis, the proto-cells would be confined in the pores of the metal substrate until the later development of lipid membranes.

==== Metabolism first: iron–sulfur world ====
The replicator in virtually all known life is deoxyribonucleic acid. DNA is far more complex than the original replicator and its replication systems are highly elaborate.

Another long-standing hypothesis is that the first life was composed of protein molecules. Amino acids, the building blocks of proteins, are easily synthesized in plausible prebiotic conditions, as are small peptides (polymers of amino acids) that make good catalysts. A series of experiments starting in 1997 showed that amino acids and peptides could form in the presence of carbon monoxide and hydrogen sulfide with iron sulfide and nickel sulfide as catalysts. Most of the steps in their assembly required temperatures of about 100 °C (212 °F) and moderate pressures, although one stage required 250 °C (482 °F) and a pressure equivalent to that found under 7 kilometers (4.3 mi) of rock. Hence, self-sustaining synthesis of proteins could have occurred near hydrothermal vents.

A difficulty with the metabolism-first scenario is finding a way for organisms to evolve. Without the ability to replicate as individuals, aggregates of molecules would have "compositional genomes" (counts of molecular species in the aggregate) as the target of natural selection. However, a recent model shows that such a system is unable to evolve in response to natural selection.

==== Membranes first: Lipid world ====
It has been suggested that double-walled "bubbles" of lipids like those that form the external membranes of cells may have been an essential first step. Experiments that simulated the conditions of the early Earth have reported the formation of lipids, and these can spontaneously form liposomes, double-walled "bubbles", and then reproduce themselves. Although they are not intrinsically information-carriers as nucleic acids are, they would be subject to natural selection for longevity and reproduction. Nucleic acids such as RNA might then have formed more easily within the liposomes than they would have outside.

==== The clay theory ====
Some clays, notably montmorillonite, have properties that make them plausible accelerators for the emergence of an RNA world: they grow by self-replication of their crystalline pattern, are subject to an analog of natural selection (as the clay "species" that grows fastest in a particular environment rapidly becomes dominant), and can catalyze the formation of RNA molecules. Although this idea has not become the scientific consensus, it still has active supporters.

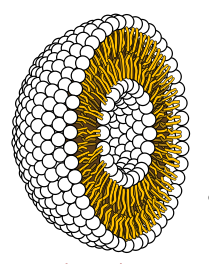
Cross-section through a liposome

Research in 2003 reported that montmorillonite could also accelerate the conversion of fatty acids into "bubbles", and that the bubbles could encapsulate RNA attached to the clay. Bubbles can then grow by absorbing additional lipids and dividing. The formation of the earliest cells may have been aided by similar processes.

A similar hypothesis presents self-replicating iron-rich clays as the progenitors of nucleotides, lipids and amino acids.

==== Last universal common ancestor ====
It is believed that of this multiplicity of protocells, only one line survived. Current phylogenetic evidence suggests that the last universal ancestor (LUA) lived during the early Archean eon, perhaps 3.5 Ga or earlier. This LUA cell is the ancestor of all life on Earth today. It was probably a prokaryote, possessing a cell membrane and probably ribosomes, but lacking a nucleus or membrane-bound organelles such as mitochondria or chloroplasts. Like modern cells, it used DNA as its genetic code, RNA for information transfer and protein synthesis, and enzymes to catalyze reactions. Some scientists believe that instead of a single organism being the last universal common ancestor, there were populations of organisms exchanging genes by lateral gene transfer.

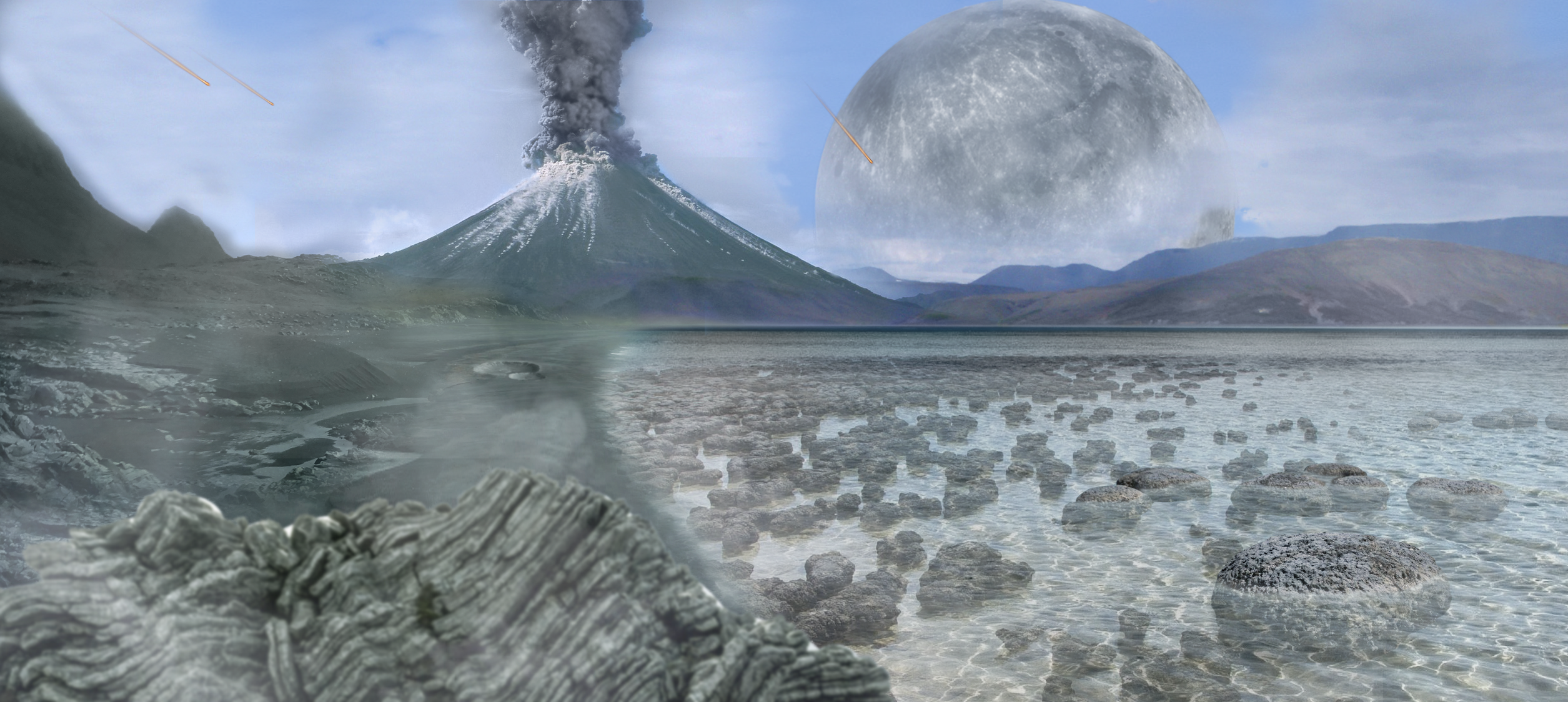
Artist's impression of Earth during the later Archean, the largely cooled planetary crust and water-rich barren surface, marked by volcanoes and continents, features already round microbialites. The Moon, still orbiting Earth much closer than today and still dominating Earth's sky, produced strong tides.

== Proterozoic Eon ==
The Proterozoic eon lasted from 2.5 Ga to 538.8 Ma (million years) ago. In this time span, cratons grew into continents with modern sizes. The change to an oxygen-rich atmosphere was a crucial development. Life developed from prokaryotes into eukaryotes and multicellular forms. The Proterozoic saw a couple of severe ice ages called Snowball Earths. After the last Snowball Earth about 600 Ma, the evolution of life on Earth accelerated. About 580 Ma, the Ediacaran biota formed the prelude for the Cambrian Explosion.

=== Oxygen revolution ===
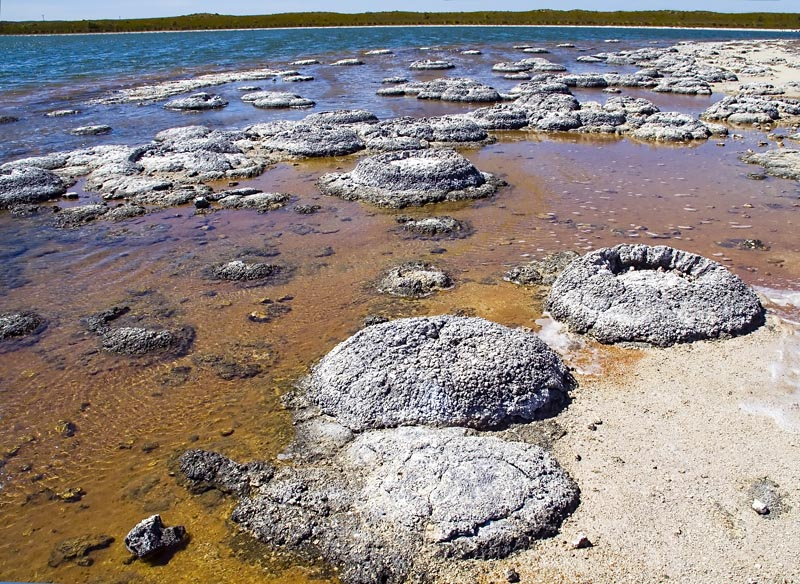
Lithified stromatolites on the shores of Lake Thetis, Western Australia. Archean stromatolites are the first direct fossil traces of life on Earth.

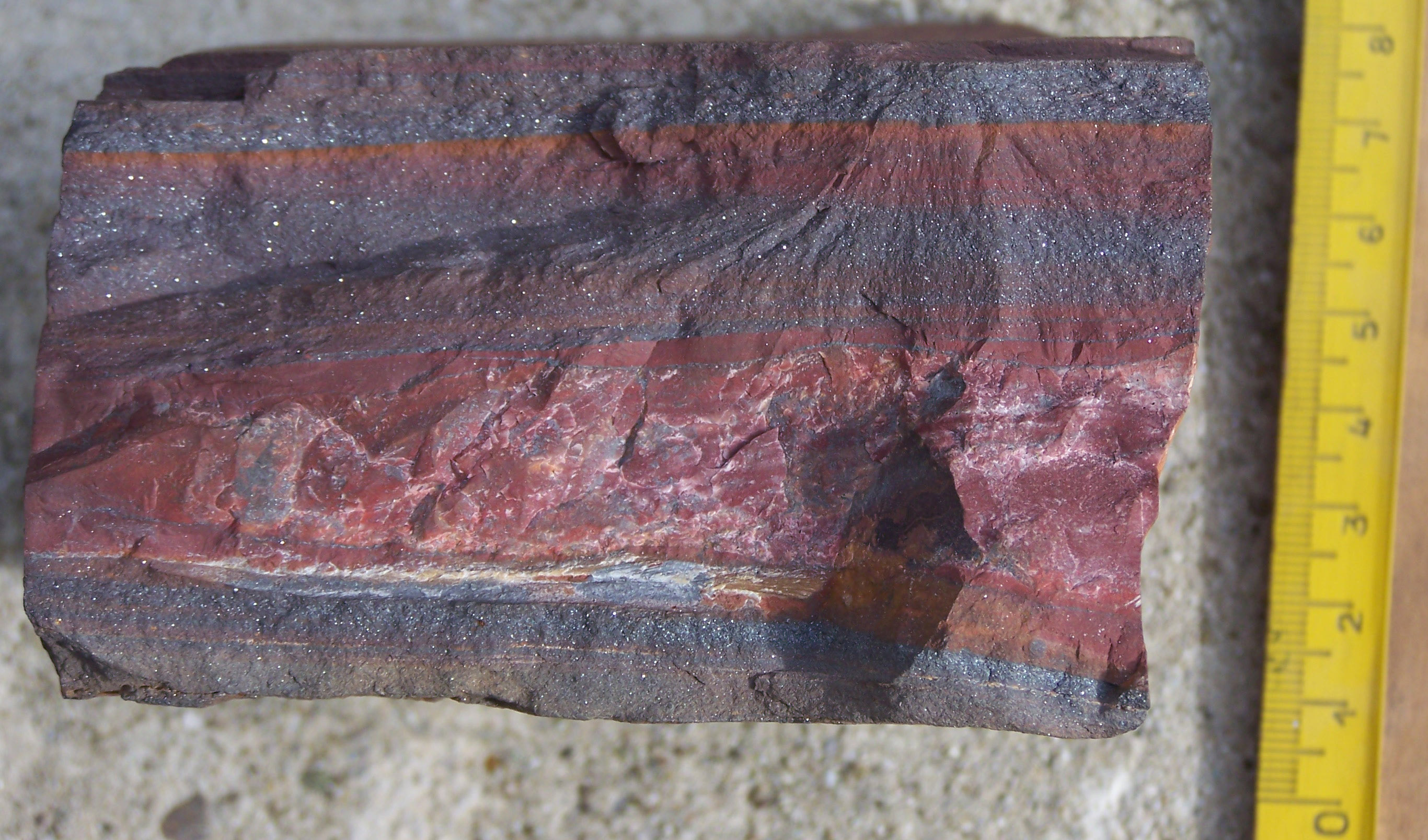
A banded iron formation from the 3.15 Ga Moodies Group, Barberton Greenstone Belt, South Africa. Red layers represent the times when oxygen was available; gray layers were formed in anoxic circumstances.

The earliest cells absorbed energy and food from the surrounding environment. They used fermentation, the breakdown of more complex compounds into less complex compounds with less energy, and used the energy so liberated to grow and reproduce. Fermentation can only occur in an anaerobic (oxygen-free) environment. The evolution of photosynthesis made it possible for cells to derive energy from the Sun.

Most of the life that covers the surface of Earth depends directly or indirectly on photosynthesis. The most common form, oxygenic photosynthesis, turns carbon dioxide, water, and sunlight into food. It captures the energy of sunlight in energy-rich molecules such as ATP, which then provide the energy to make sugars. To supply the electrons in the circuit, hydrogen is stripped from water, leaving oxygen as a waste product. Some organisms, including purple bacteria and green sulfur bacteria, use an anoxygenic form of photosynthesis that uses alternatives to hydrogen stripped from water as electron donors; examples are hydrogen sulfide, sulfur and iron. Such extremophile organisms are restricted to otherwise inhospitable environments such as hot springs and hydrothermal vents.

The simpler anoxygenic form arose about 3.8 Ga, not long after the appearance of life. The timing of oxygenic photosynthesis is more controversial; it had certainly appeared by about 2.4 Ga, but some researchers put it back as far as 3.2 Ga. The latter "probably increased global productivity by at least two or three orders of magnitude". Among the oldest remnants of oxygen-producing lifeforms are fossil stromatolites.

At first, the released oxygen was bound up with limestone, iron, and other minerals. The oxidized iron appears as red layers in geological strata called banded iron formations that formed in abundance during the Siderian period (between 2500 Ma and 2300 Ma). When most of the exposed readily reacting minerals were oxidized, oxygen finally began to accumulate in the atmosphere. Though each cell only produced a minute amount of oxygen, the combined metabolism of many cells over a vast time transformed Earth's atmosphere to its current state. This was Earth's third atmosphere.

Some oxygen was stimulated by solar ultraviolet radiation to form ozone, which collected in a layer near the upper part of the atmosphere. The ozone layer absorbed, and still absorbs, a significant amount of the ultraviolet radiation that once had passed through the atmosphere. It allowed cells to colonize the surface of the ocean and eventually the land: without the ozone layer, ultraviolet radiation bombarding land and sea would have caused unsustainable levels of mutation in exposed cells.

Graph showing range of estimated partial pressure of atmospheric oxygen through geologic time

Photosynthesis had another major impact. Oxygen was toxic; much life on Earth probably died out as its levels rose in what is known as the oxygen catastrophe. Resistant forms survived and thrived, and some developed the ability to use oxygen to increase their metabolism and obtain more energy from the same food.

=== Snowball Earth ===
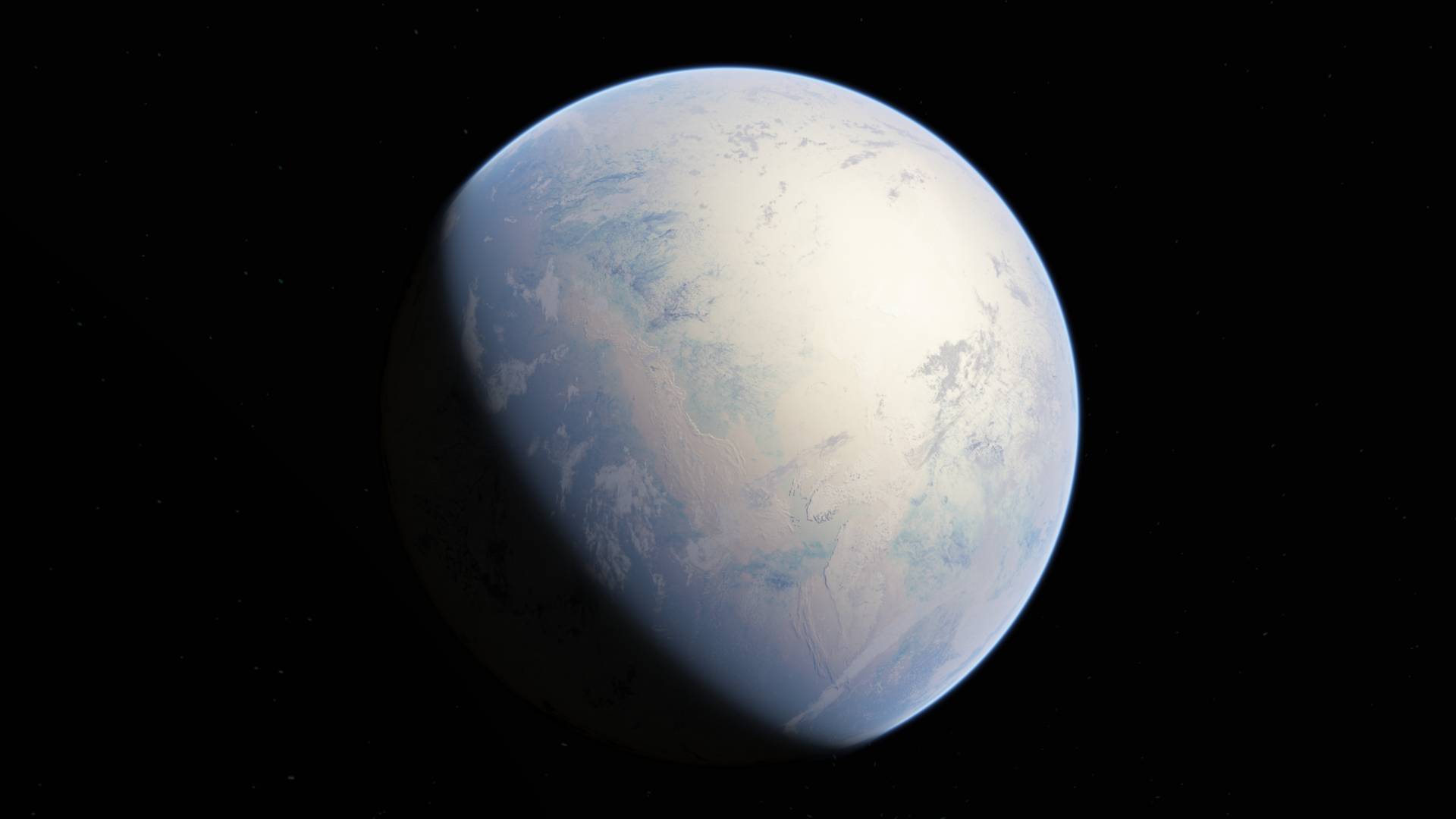
Artist's rendition of an oxinated fully-frozen Snowball Earth with no remaining liquid surface water.

The natural evolution of the Sun made it progressively more luminous during the Archean and Proterozoic eons; the Sun's luminosity increases 6% every billion years. As a result, Earth began to receive more heat from the Sun in the Proterozoic eon. However, Earth did not get warmer. Instead, the geological record suggests it cooled dramatically during the early Proterozoic. Glacial deposits found in South Africa date back to 2.2 Ga, at which time, based on paleomagnetic evidence, they must have been located near the equator. Thus, this glaciation, known as the Huronian glaciation, may have been global. Some scientists suggest this was so severe that Earth was frozen over from the poles to the equator, a hypothesis called Snowball Earth.

The Huronian ice age might have been caused by the increased oxygen concentration in the atmosphere, which caused the decrease of methane (CH_{4}) in the atmosphere. Methane is a strong greenhouse gas, but with oxygen it reacts to form CO_{2}, a less effective greenhouse gas. When free oxygen became available in the atmosphere, the concentration of methane could have decreased dramatically, enough to counter the effect of the increasing heat flow from the Sun.

However, the term Snowball Earth is more commonly used to describe later extreme ice ages during the Cryogenian period. There were four periods, each lasting about 10 million years, between 750 and 580 million years ago, when Earth is thought to have been covered with ice apart from the highest mountains, and average temperatures were about −50 °C (−58 °F). The snowball may have been partly due to the location of the supercontinent Rodinia straddling the Equator. Carbon dioxide combines with rain to weather rocks to form carbonic acid, which is then washed out to sea, thus extracting the greenhouse gas from the atmosphere. When the continents are near the poles, the advance of ice covers the rocks, slowing the reduction in carbon dioxide, but in the Cryogenian the weathering of Rodinia was able to continue unchecked until the ice advanced to the tropics. The process may have finally been reversed by the emission of carbon dioxide from volcanoes or the destabilization of methane gas hydrates. According to the alternative Slushball Earth theory, even at the height of the ice ages there was still open water at the Equator.

=== Emergence of eukaryotes ===
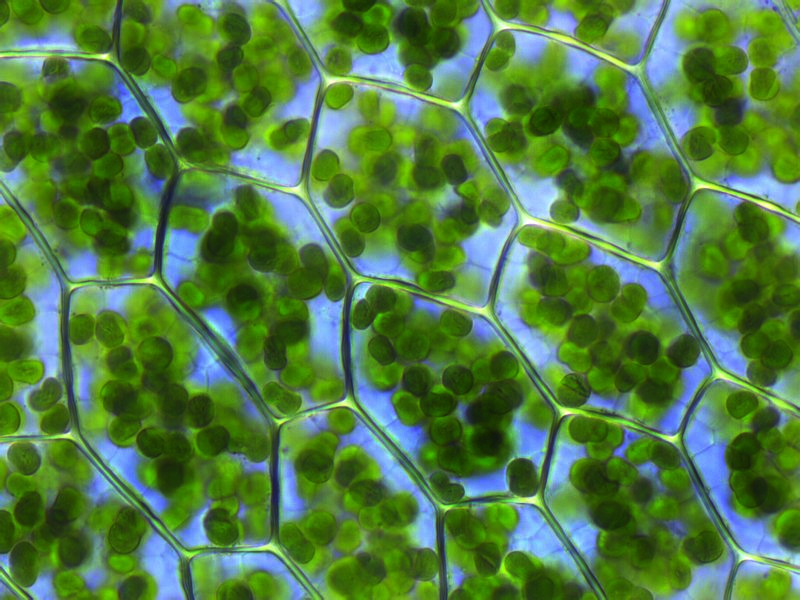
Chloroplasts in the cells of a moss

Modern taxonomy classifies life into three domains. The time of their origin is uncertain. The Bacteria domain probably first split off from the other forms of life (sometimes called Neomura), but this supposition is controversial. Soon after this, by 2 Ga, the Neomura split into the Archaea and the Eukaryota. Eukaryotic cells (Eukaryota) are larger and more complex than prokaryotic cells (Bacteria and Archaea), and the origin of that complexity is only now becoming known. The earliest fossils possessing features typical of fungi date to the Paleoproterozoic era, some 2.4 Ga ago; these multicellular benthic organisms had filamentous structures capable of anastomosis.

Around this time, the first proto-mitochondrion was formed. A bacterial cell related to today's Rickettsia, which had evolved to metabolize oxygen, entered a larger prokaryotic cell, which lacked that capability. Perhaps the large cell attempted to digest the smaller one but failed (possibly due to the evolution of prey defenses). The smaller cell may have tried to parasitize the larger one. In any case, the smaller cell survived inside the larger cell. Using oxygen, it metabolized the larger cell's waste products and derived more energy. Part of this excess energy was returned to the host. The smaller cell replicated inside the larger one. Soon, a stable symbiosis developed between the large cell and the smaller cells inside it. Over time, the host cell acquired some genes from the smaller cells, and the two kinds became dependent on each other: the larger cell could not survive without the energy produced by the smaller ones, and these, in turn, could not survive without the raw materials provided by the larger cell. The whole cell is now considered a single organism, and the smaller cells are classified as organelles called mitochondria.

A similar event occurred with photosynthetic cyanobacteria entering large heterotrophic cells and becoming chloroplasts. Probably as a result of these changes, a line of cells capable of photosynthesis split off from the other eukaryotes more than 1 billion years ago. There were probably several such inclusion events. Besides the well-established endosymbiotic theory of the cellular origin of mitochondria and chloroplasts, there are theories that cells led to peroxisomes, spirochetes led to cilia and flagella, and that perhaps a DNA virus led to the cell nucleus, though none of them are widely accepted.

Archaeans, bacteria, and eukaryotes continued to diversify and to become more complex and better adapted to their environments. Each domain repeatedly split into multiple lineages. Around 1.1 Ga, the plant, animal, and fungi lines had split, though they still existed as solitary cells. Some of these lived in colonies, and gradually a division of labor began to take place; for instance, cells on the periphery might have started to assume different roles from those in the interior. Although the division between a colony with specialized cells and a multicellular organism is not always clear, around 1 billion years ago, the first multicellular plants emerged, probably green algae. Possibly by around 900 Ma true multicellularity had also evolved in animals.

At first, it probably resembled today's sponges, which have totipotent cells that allow a disrupted organism to reassemble itself. As the division of labor was completed in the different lineages of multicellular organisms, cells became more specialized and more dependent on each other.

=== Supercontinents in the Proterozoic ===
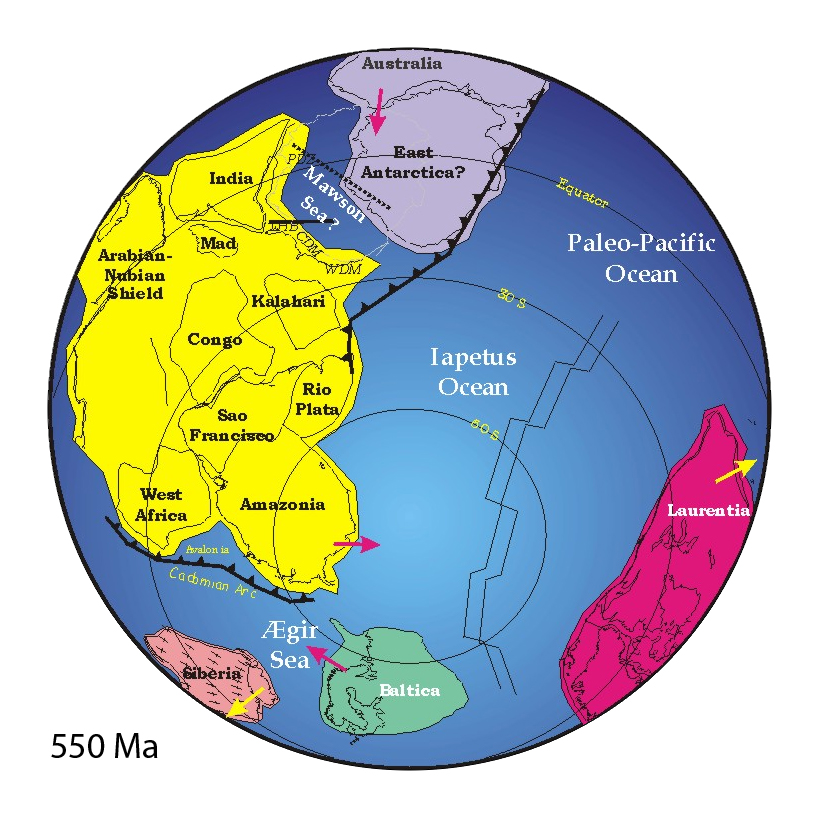
A reconstruction of Pannotia (550 Ma).

Reconstructions of tectonic plate movement in the past 250 million years (the Cenozoic and Mesozoic eras) can be made reliably using fitting of continental margins, ocean floor magnetic anomalies and paleomagnetic poles. No ocean crust dates back further than that, so earlier reconstructions are more difficult. Paleomagnetic poles are supplemented by geologic evidence such as orogenic belts, which mark the edges of ancient plates, and past distributions of flora and fauna. The further back in time, the scarcer and harder to interpret the data get and the more uncertain the reconstructions.

Throughout the history of Earth, there have been times when continents collided and formed a supercontinent, which later broke up into new continents. About 1000 to 830 Ma, most continental mass was united in the supercontinent Rodinia. Rodinia may have been preceded by Early-Middle Proterozoic continents called Nuna and Columbia.

After the break-up of Rodinia about 800 Ma, the continents may have formed another short-lived supercontinent around 550 Ma. The hypothetical supercontinent is sometimes referred to as Pannotia or Vendia. The evidence for it is a phase of continental collision known as the Pan-African orogeny, which joined the continental masses of current-day Africa, South America, Antarctica and Australia. The existence of Pannotia depends on the timing of the rifting between Gondwana (which included most of the landmass now in the Southern Hemisphere, as well as the Arabian Peninsula and the Indian subcontinent) and Laurentia (roughly equivalent to current-day North America). It is at least certain that by the end of the Proterozoic eon, most of the continental mass lay united in a position around the south pole.

=== Late Proterozoic climate and life ===
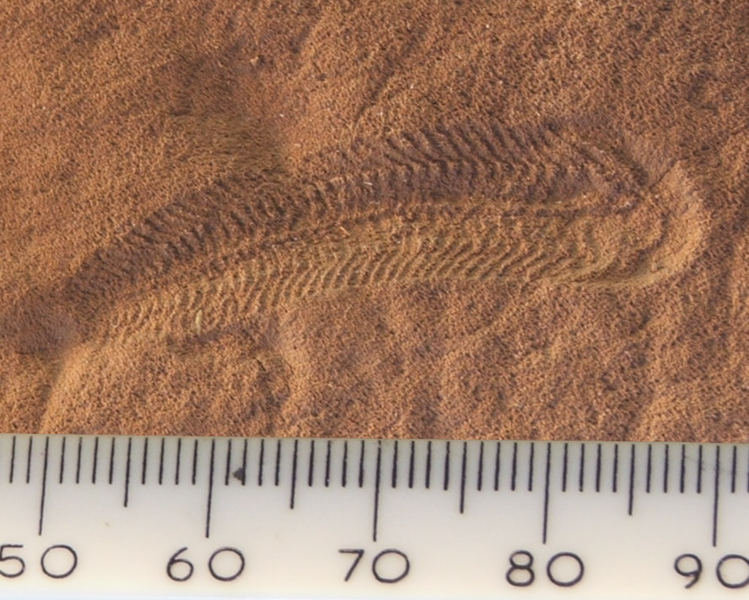
A 580 million year old fossil of Spriggina floundensi, an animal from the Ediacaran period. Such life forms could have been ancestors to the many new forms that originated in the Cambrian Explosion.

The end of the Proterozoic saw at least two Snowball Earths, so severe that the surface of the oceans may have been completely frozen. This happened about 716.5 and 635 Ma, in the Cryogenian period. The intensity and mechanism of both glaciations are still under investigation and harder to explain than the early Proterozoic Snowball Earth. Most paleoclimatologists think the cold episodes were linked to the formation of the supercontinent Rodinia. Because Rodinia was centered on the equator, rates of chemical weathering increased and carbon dioxide (CO_{2}) was taken from the atmosphere. Because CO_{2} is an important greenhouse gas, climates cooled globally.

In the same way, during the Snowball Earths most of the continental surface was covered with permafrost, which decreased chemical weathering again, leading to the end of the glaciations. An alternative hypothesis is that enough carbon dioxide escaped through volcanic outgassing that the resulting greenhouse effect raised global temperatures. Increased volcanic activity resulted from the break-up of Rodinia at about the same time.

The Cryogenian period was followed by the Ediacaran period, which was characterized by a rapid development of new multicellular lifeforms. Whether there is a connection between the end of the severe ice ages and the increase in diversity of life is not clear, but it does not seem coincidental. The new forms of life, called Ediacara biota, were larger and more diverse than ever. Though the taxonomy of most Ediacaran life forms is unclear, some were ancestors of groups of modern life. Important developments were the origin of muscular and neural cells. None of the Ediacaran fossils had hard body parts like skeletons. These first appear after the boundary between the Proterozoic and Phanerozoic eons or Ediacaran and Cambrian periods.

== Phanerozoic Eon ==
The Phanerozoic is the current eon on Earth, which started approximately 538.8 million years ago. It consists of three eras: The Paleozoic, Mesozoic, and Cenozoic, and is the time when multi-cellular life greatly diversified into almost all the organisms known today.

The Paleozoic ("old life") era was the first and longest era of the Phanerozoic eon, lasting from 538.8 to 251.9 Ma. During the Paleozoic, many modern groups of life came into existence. Life colonized the land, first plants, then animals. Two significant extinctions occurred. The continents formed at the break-up of Pannotia and Rodinia at the end of the Proterozoic slowly moved together again, forming the supercontinent Pangaea in the late Paleozoic.

The Mesozoic ("middle life") era lasted from 251.9 Ma to 66 Ma. It is subdivided into the Triassic, Jurassic, and Cretaceous periods. The era began with the Permian–Triassic extinction event, the most severe extinction event in the fossil record whereby 95% of species on Earth died out, and ended with the Cretaceous–Paleogene extinction event that wiped out the dinosaurs.

The Cenozoic ("new life") era began at 66 Ma, and is subdivided into the Paleogene, Neogene, and Quaternary periods. These three periods are further split into seven subdivisions, with the Paleogene composed of The Paleocene, Eocene, and Oligocene, the Neogene divided into the Miocene, Pliocene, and the Quaternary composed of the Pleistocene, and Holocene. Mammals, birds, amphibians, crocodilians, turtles, and lepidosaurs survived the Cretaceous–Paleogene extinction event that killed off the non-avian dinosaurs and many other forms of life, and this is the era during which they diversified into their modern forms.

=== Tectonics, paleogeography and climate ===
Pangaea was a supercontinent that existed from about 300 to 180 Ma. The outlines of the modern continents and other landmasses are indicated on this map.

At the end of the Proterozoic, the supercontinent Pannotia had broken apart into the smaller continents Laurentia, Baltica, Siberia and Gondwana. During periods when continents move apart, more oceanic crust is formed by volcanic activity. Because the young volcanic crust is relatively hotter and less dense than the old oceanic crust, the ocean floors rise during such periods. This causes the sea level to rise. Therefore, in the first half of the Paleozoic, large areas of the continents were below sea level.

Early Paleozoic climates were warmer than today, but the end of the Ordovician saw a short ice age during which glaciers covered the south pole, where the huge continent Gondwana was situated. Traces of glaciation from this period are only found on former Gondwana. During the Late Ordovician ice age, a few mass extinctions took place, in which many brachiopods, trilobites, Bryozoa and corals disappeared. These marine species could probably not contend with the decreasing temperature of the sea water.

The continents Laurentia and Baltica collided between 450 and 400 Ma, during the Caledonian Orogeny, to form Laurussia (also known as Euramerica). Traces of the mountain belt this collision caused can be found in Scandinavia, Scotland, and the northern Appalachians. In the Devonian period (416–359 Ma) Gondwana and Siberia began to move towards Laurussia. The collision of Siberia with Laurussia caused the Uralian Orogeny, the collision of Gondwana with Laurussia is called the Variscan or Hercynian Orogeny in Europe or the Alleghenian Orogeny in North America. The latter phase took place during the Carboniferous period (359–299 Ma) and resulted in the formation of the last supercontinent, Pangaea.

Around 180 Ma, Pangaea began to break up into Laurasia and Gondwana.

=== Cambrian explosion ===
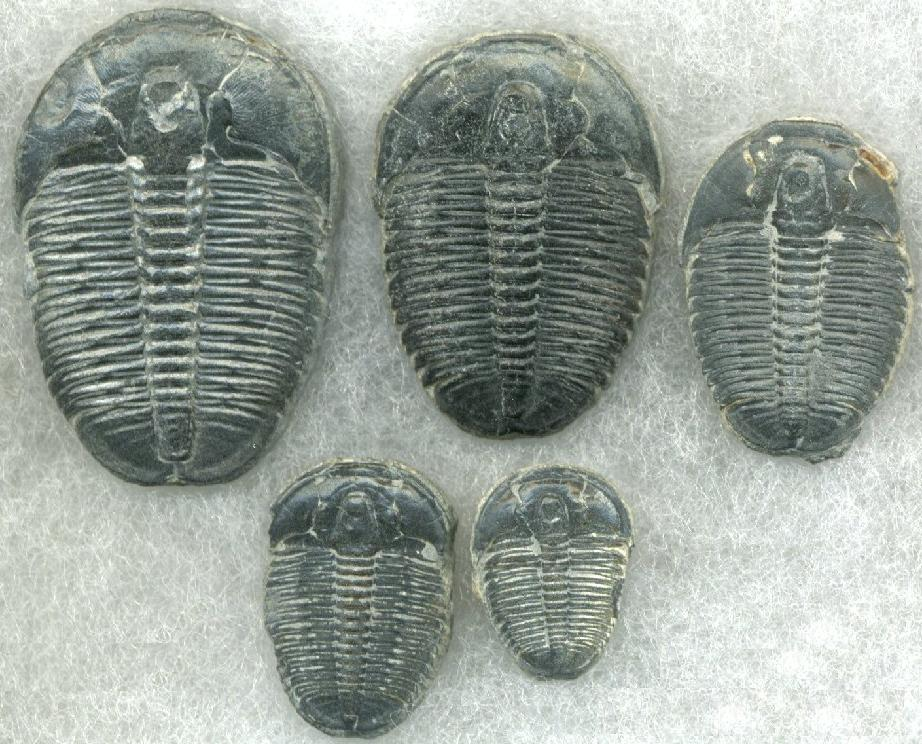
Trilobites first appeared during the Cambrian period and were among the most widespread and diverse groups of Paleozoic organisms.

The rate of the evolution of life as recorded by fossils accelerated in the Cambrian period (542–488 Ma). The sudden emergence of many new species, phyla, and forms in this period is called the Cambrian Explosion. It was a form of adaptive radiation, where vacant niches left by the extinct Ediacaran biota were filled up by the emergence of new phyla. The biological fomenting in the Cambrian Explosion was unprecedented before and since that time. Whereas the Ediacaran life forms appear yet primitive and not easy to put in any modern group, at the end of the Cambrian, most modern phyla were already present. The development of hard body parts such as shells, skeletons or exoskeletons in animals like molluscs, echinoderms, crinoids and arthropods (a well-known group of arthropods from the lower Paleozoic are the trilobites) made the preservation and fossilization of such life forms easier than those of their Proterozoic ancestors. For this reason, much more is known about life in and after the Cambrian period than about life in older periods. Some of these Cambrian groups appear complex but are seemingly quite different from modern life; examples are Anomalocaris and Haikouichthys. More recently, however, these seem to have found a place in modern classification.

During the Cambrian, the first vertebrate animals, among them the first fishes, had appeared. A creature that could have been the ancestor of the fishes, or was probably closely related to it, was Pikaia. It had a primitive notochord, a structure that could have developed into a vertebral column later. The first fishes with jaws (Gnathostomata) appeared during the next geological period, the Ordovician. The colonisation of new niches resulted in massive body sizes. In this way, fishes with increasing sizes evolved during the early Paleozoic, such as the titanic placoderm Dunkleosteus, which could grow 7 meters (23 ft) long.

The diversity of life forms did not increase significantly because of a series of mass extinctions that define widespread biostratigraphic units called biomeres. After each extinction pulse, the continental shelf regions were repopulated by similar life forms that may have been evolving slowly elsewhere. By the late Cambrian, the trilobites had reached their greatest diversity and dominated nearly all fossil assemblages.

=== Colonization of land ===
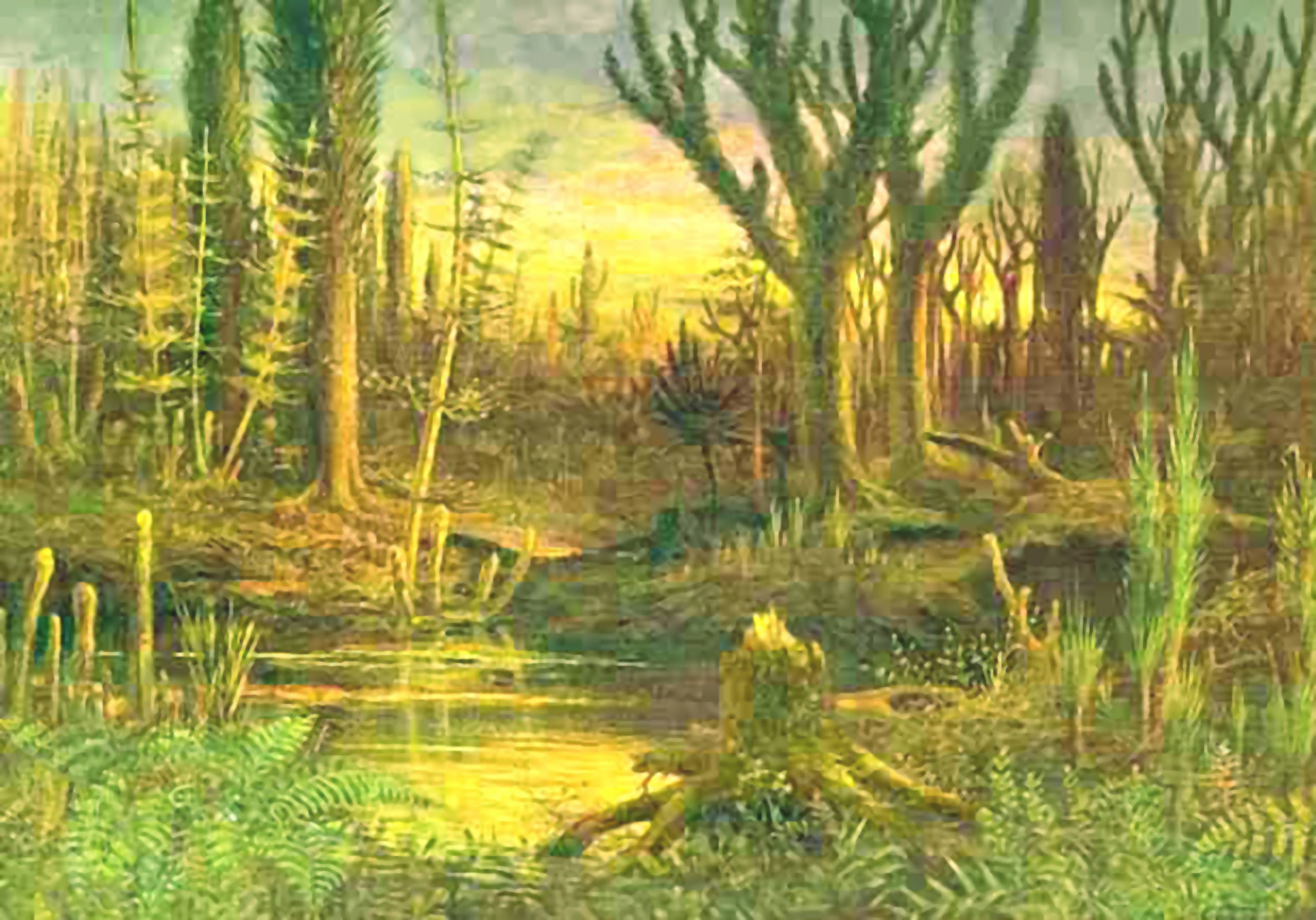
Artist's conception of Devonian flora

Oxygen accumulation from photosynthesis resulted in the formation of an ozone layer that absorbed much of the Sun's ultraviolet radiation, meaning unicellular organisms that reached land were less likely to die, and prokaryotes began to multiply and become better adapted to survival out of the water. Prokaryote lineages had probably colonized the land as early as 3 Ga even before the origin of the eukaryotes. For a long time, the land remained barren of multicellular organisms. The supercontinent Pannotia formed around 600 Ma and then broke apart a short 50 million years later. Fish, the earliest vertebrates, evolved in the oceans around 530 Ma. A major extinction event occurred near the end of the Cambrian period, which ended 488 Ma.

Several hundred million years ago, plants (probably resembling algae) and fungi started growing at the edges of the water and then out of it. The oldest fossils of land fungi and plants date to 480–460 Ma, though molecular evidence suggests the fungi may have colonized the land as early as 1000 Ma and the plants 700 Ma. Initially remaining close to the water's edge, mutations and variations resulted in further colonization of this new environment. The timing of the first animals to leave the oceans is not precisely known: the oldest clear evidence is of arthropods on land around 450 Ma, perhaps thriving and becoming better adapted due to the vast food source provided by the terrestrial plants. There is also unconfirmed evidence that arthropods may have appeared on land as early as 530 Ma.

=== Evolution of tetrapods ===
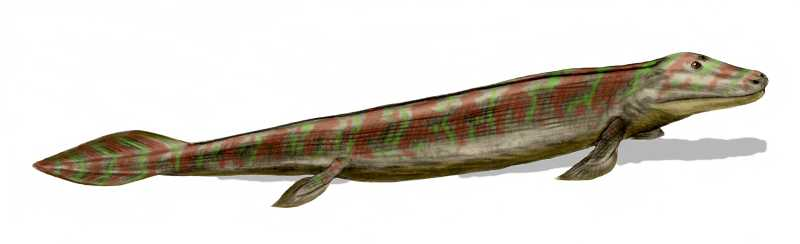
Tiktaalik, a fish with limb-like fins and a predecessor of tetrapods. Reconstruction from fossils about 375 million years old.

At the end of the Ordovician period, 443 Ma, additional extinction events occurred, perhaps due to a concurrent ice age. Around 380 to 375 Ma, the first tetrapods evolved from fish. Fins evolved to become limbs that the first tetrapods used to lift their heads out of the water to breathe air. This would let them live in oxygen-poor water, or pursue small prey in shallow water. They may have later ventured on land for brief periods. Eventually, some of them became so well adapted to terrestrial life that they spent their adult lives on land, although they hatched in the water and returned to lay their eggs. This was the origin of the amphibians. About 365 Ma, another period of extinction occurred, perhaps as a result of global cooling. Plants evolved seeds, which dramatically accelerated their spread on land, around this time (by approximately 360 Ma).

About 20 million years later (340 Ma), the amniotic egg evolved, which could be laid on land, giving a survival advantage to tetrapod embryos. This resulted in the divergence of amniotes from amphibians. Another 30 million years (310 Ma) saw the divergence of the synapsids (including mammals) from the sauropsids (including birds and reptiles). Other groups of organisms continued to evolve, and lines diverged—in fish, insects, bacteria, and so on—but less is known of the details.

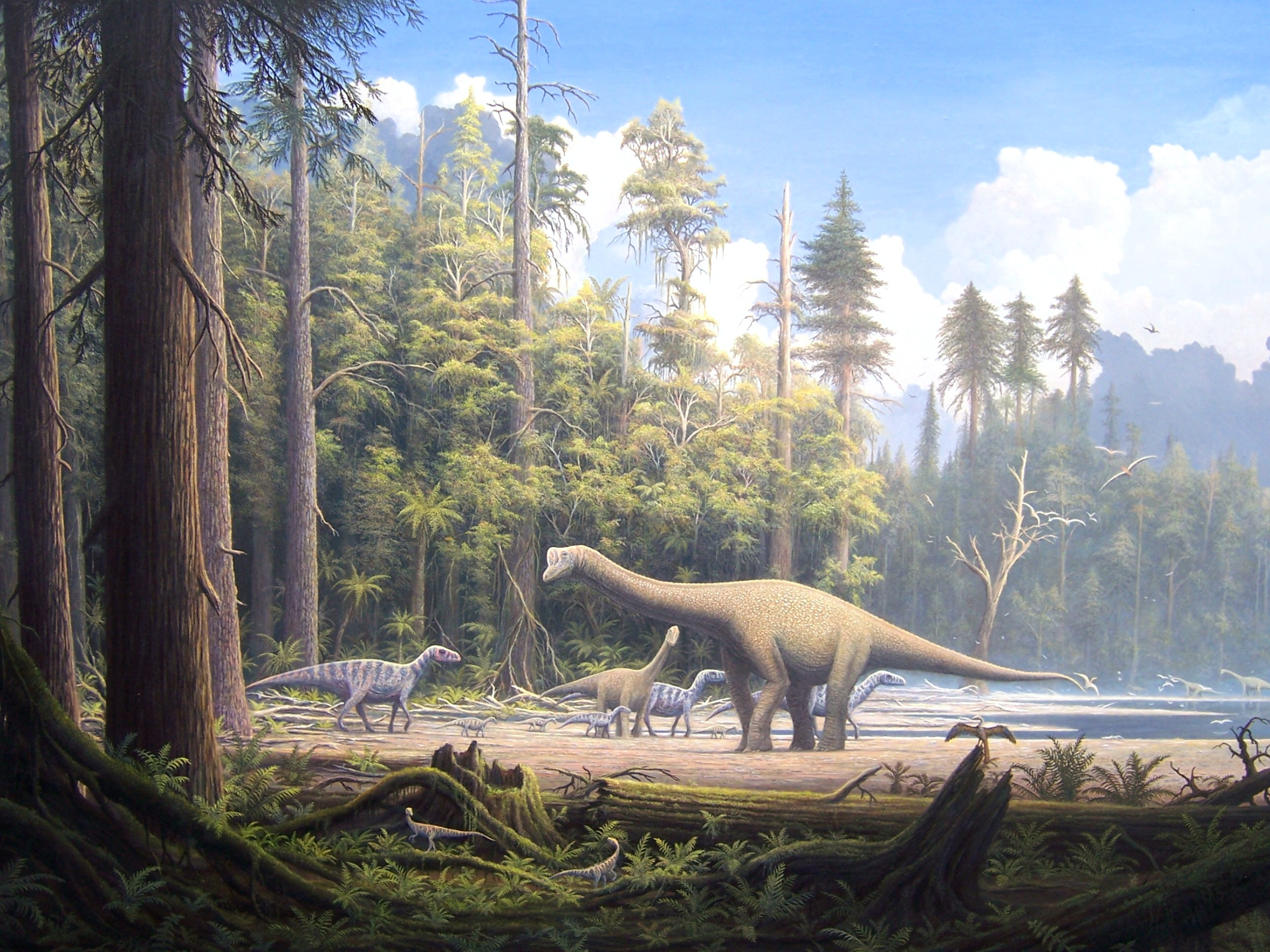
Dinosaurs were the dominant terrestrial vertebrates throughout most of the Mesozoic

Following the Permian–Triassic extinction event, the most severe known mass extinction in Earth's history, at the end of the Permian about 252 Ma, dinosaurs split off from their reptilian ancestors around 230 Ma. The Triassic–Jurassic extinction event at 200 Ma spared many of the dinosaurs, and they soon became dominant among the vertebrates. Though some mammalian lines began to separate during this period, existing mammals were probably small animals resembling shrews.

The boundary between avian and non-avian dinosaurs is unclear, but Archaeopteryx, traditionally considered one of the first birds, lived around 150 Ma.

The earliest evidence for the angiosperms evolving flowers is during the Cretaceous period, some 20 million years later (132 Ma).

=== Extinctions ===
The first of five great mass extinctions was the Ordovician-Silurian extinction. Its possible cause was the intense glaciation of Gondwana, which eventually led to a Snowball Earth. 60% of marine invertebrates became extinct, and 25% of all families.

The second mass extinction was the Late Devonian extinction, probably caused by the evolution of trees, which could have led to the depletion of greenhouse gases (like CO_{2}) or the eutrophication of water. 70% of all species became extinct.

The third mass extinction was the Permian-Triassic, or the Great Dying, event. The event was possibly caused by some combination of the Siberian Traps volcanic event, an asteroid impact, methane hydrate gasification, sea level fluctuations, and a major anoxic event. Either the proposed Wilkes Land crater in Antarctica or Bedout structure off the northwest coast of Australia may indicate an impact connection with the Permian-Triassic extinction. But it remains uncertain whether these or other proposed Permian-Triassic boundary craters are real impact craters or even contemporary with the Permian-Triassic extinction event. This was by far the deadliest extinction ever, with about 57% of all families and 83% of all genera killed.

The fourth mass extinction was the Triassic-Jurassic extinction event in which almost all synapsids and archosaurs became extinct, probably due to new competition from dinosaurs.

The fifth and most recent mass extinction was the Cretaceous-Paleogene extinction event. In 66 Ma, a 10-kilometer (6.2 mi) asteroid struck Earth just off the Yucatán Peninsula—somewhere in the southwestern tip of then Laurasia—where the Chicxulub crater is today. This ejected vast quantities of particulate matter and vapor into the air that occluded sunlight, inhibiting photosynthesis. 75% of all life, including the non-avian dinosaurs, became extinct, marking the end of the Cretaceous period and Mesozoic era.

=== Diversification of mammals ===
The first true mammals evolved in the shadows of dinosaurs and other large archosaurs that filled the world by the late Triassic. The first mammals were very small, and were probably nocturnal to escape predation. Mammal diversification truly began only after the Cretaceous-Paleogene extinction event. By the early Paleocene Earth recovered from the extinction, and mammalian diversity increased. Creatures like Ambulocetus took to the oceans to eventually evolve into whales, whereas some creatures, like primates, took to the trees. This all changed during the mid to late Eocene when the circum-Antarctic current formed between Antarctica and Australia which disrupted weather patterns on a global scale. Grassless savanna began to predominate much of the landscape, and mammals such as Andrewsarchus rose up to become the largest known terrestrial predatory mammal ever, and early whales like Basilosaurus took control of the seas.

The evolution of grasses brought a remarkable change to Earth's landscape, and the new open spaces pushed mammals to get bigger and bigger. Grass started to expand in the Miocene, and the Miocene is where many modern- day mammals first appeared. Giant ungulates like Paraceratherium and Deinotherium evolved to rule the grasslands. The evolution of grass also brought primates down from the trees, and started human evolution. The first big cats evolved during this time as well. The Tethys Sea was closed off by the collision of Africa and Europe.

The formation of Panama was perhaps the most important geological event to occur in the last 60 million years. Atlantic and Pacific currents were closed off from each other, which caused the formation of the Gulf Stream, which made Europe warmer. The land bridge allowed the isolated creatures of South America to migrate over to North America and vice versa. Various species migrated south, leading to the presence in South America of llamas, the spectacled bear, kinkajous and jaguars.

Three million years ago saw the start of the Pleistocene epoch, which featured dramatic climatic changes due to the ice ages. The ice ages led to the evolution and expansion of modern man in Saharan Africa. The mega-fauna that dominated fed on grasslands that, by now, had taken over much of the subtropical world. The large amounts of water held in the ice allowed various water bodies to shrink and sometimes disappear, such as the North Sea and the Bering Strait. It is believed by many that a huge migration took place along Beringia, which is why, today, there are camels (which evolved and became extinct in North America), horses (which evolved and became extinct in North America), and Native Americans. The end of the last ice age coincided with the expansion of man and a massive die out of ice age mega-fauna.

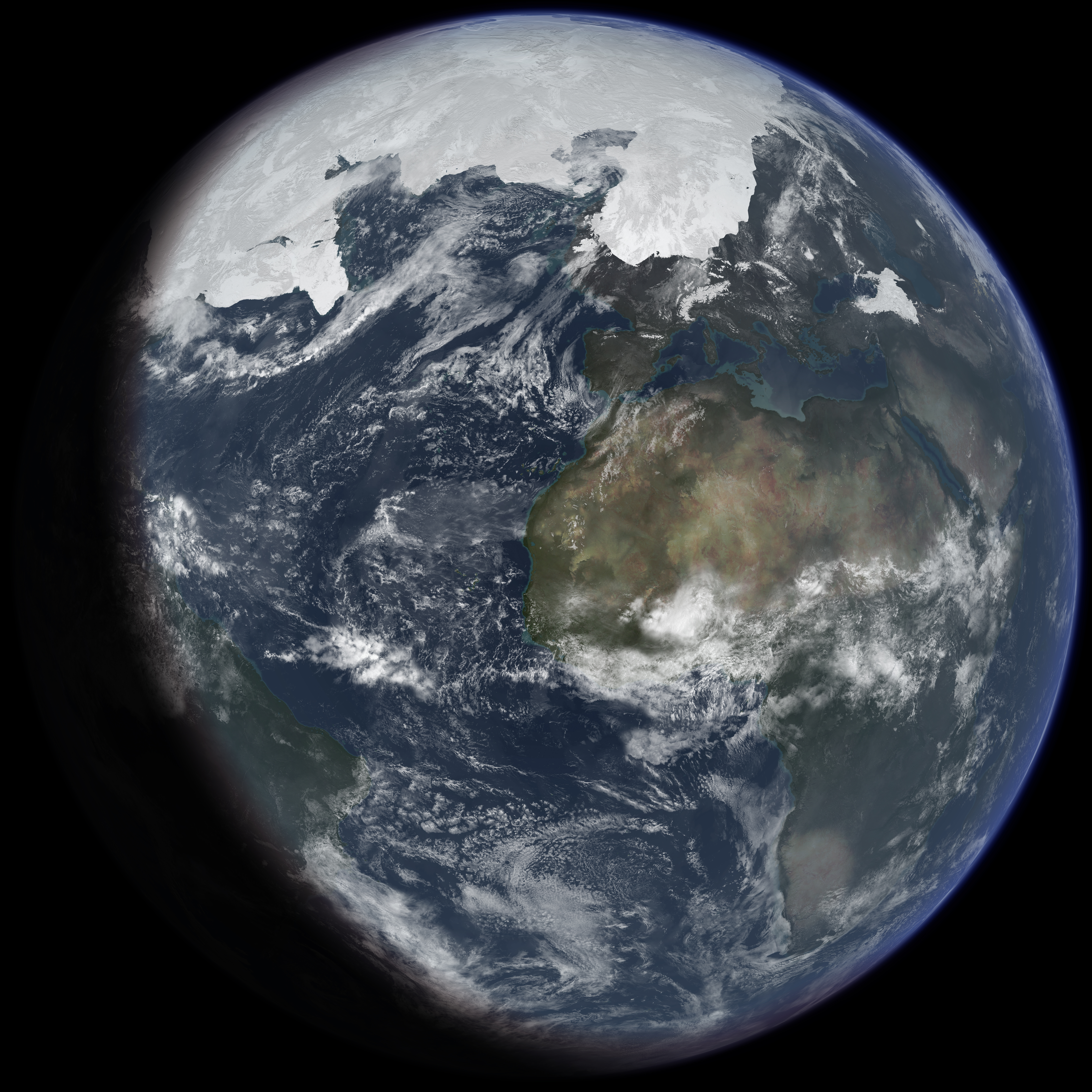
An artist's impression of ice age Earth at glacial maximum.

=== Human evolution ===
Hominin timeline
← / Earlier apes; ← / Gorilla split; ← / Chimpanzee split; ← / Earliest bipedal; ← / Earliest sign of Ardipithecus; ← / Earliest sign of Australopithecus; ← / Earliest stone tools; ← / Earliest sign of Homo; ← / Dispersal beyond Africa; ← / Earliest fire / cooking; ← / Earliest rock art; ← / Earliest clothes; ← / Modern humans
(million years ago)

A small African ape living around 6 Ma was the last animal whose descendants would include both modern humans and their closest relatives, the chimpanzees. Only two branches of its family tree have surviving descendants. Very soon after the split, for reasons that are still unclear, apes in one branch developed the ability to walk upright. Brain size increased rapidly, and by 2 Ma, the first animals classified in the genus Homo had appeared. Around the same time, the other branch split into the ancestors of the common chimpanzee and the ancestors of the bonobo as evolution continued simultaneously in all life forms.

The ability to control fire probably began in Homo erectus (or Homo ergaster), probably at least 790,000 years ago but perhaps as early as 1.5 Ma. The use and discovery of controlled fire may even predate Homo erectus. Fire was possibly used by the early Lower Paleolithic (Oldowan) hominid Homo habilis or strong australopithecines such as Paranthropus.

A reconstruction of human history based on fossil data.

It is more difficult to establish the origin of language; it is unclear whether Homo erectus could speak or if that capability had not begun until Homo sapiens. As brain size increased, babies were born earlier, before their heads grew too large to pass through the pelvis. As a result, they exhibited more plasticity, thus possessing an increased capacity to learn and requiring a longer period of dependence. Social skills became more complex, language became more sophisticated, and tools became more elaborate. This contributed to further cooperation and intellectual development. Modern humans (Homo sapiens) are believed to have originated around 200,000 years ago or earlier in Africa; the oldest fossils date back to around 160,000 years ago.

The first humans to show signs of spirituality are the Neanderthals (usually classified as a separate species with no surviving descendants); they buried their dead, often with no sign of food or tools. However, evidence of more sophisticated beliefs, such as the early Cro-Magnon cave paintings (probably with magical or religious significance) did not appear until 32,000 years ago. Cro-Magnons also left behind stone figurines such as Venus of Willendorf, probably also signifying religious belief. By 11,000 years ago, Homo sapiens had reached the southern tip of South America, the last of the uninhabited continents (except for Antarctica, which remained undiscovered until 1820 AD). Tool use and communication continued to improve, and interpersonal relationships became more intricate.

==== Human history ====
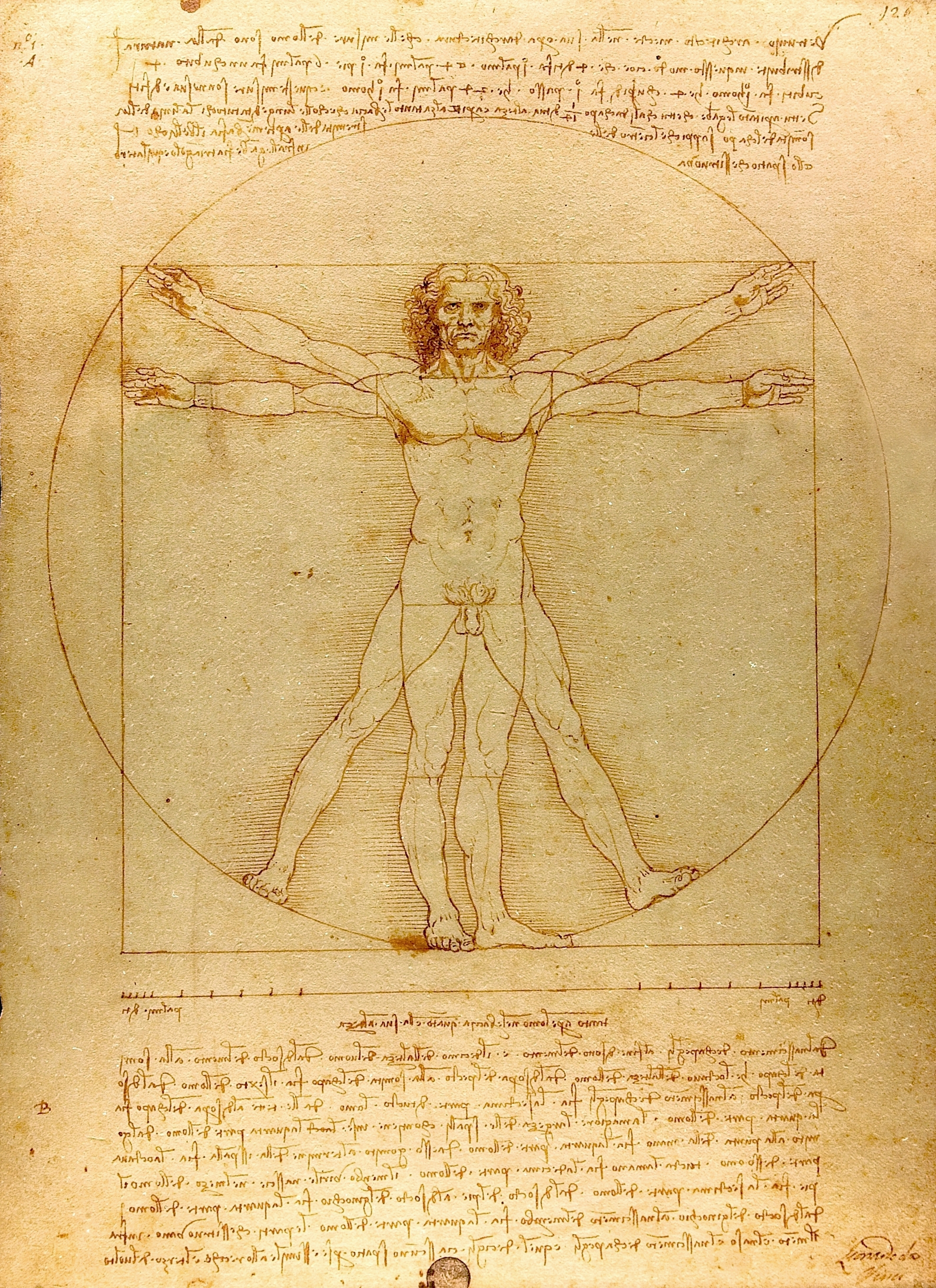
Vitruvian Man, c. 1490 by Leonardo da Vinci, epitomizes the advances in art and science seen during the Renaissance.

Throughout more than 90% of its history, Homo sapiens lived in small bands as nomadic hunter-gatherers. As language became more complex, the ability to remember and communicate information resulted in a new replicator: the meme. Ideas could be exchanged quickly and passed down the generations. Cultural evolution quickly outpaced biological evolution, and history proper began. Between 8500 and 7000 BC, humans in the Fertile Crescent in the Middle East began the systematic husbandry of plants and animals: agriculture. This spread to neighboring regions and developed independently elsewhere until most Homo sapiens lived sedentary lives in permanent settlements as farmers. Not all societies abandoned nomadism, especially those in isolated areas of the globe poor in domesticable plant species, such as Australia. However, among those civilizations that did adopt agriculture, the relative stability and increased productivity provided by farming allowed the population to expand.

Agriculture had a major impact; humans began to affect the environment as never before. Surplus food allowed a priestly or governing class to arise, followed by increasing division of labor. This led to Earth's first civilization at Sumer in the Middle East, between 4000 and 3000 BC. Additional civilizations quickly arose in ancient Egypt, at the Indus River valley and in China. The invention of writing enabled complex societies to arise: record-keeping and libraries served as a storehouse of knowledge and increased the cultural transmission of information. Humans no longer had to spend all their time working for survival, enabling the first specialized occupations (e.g. craftsmen, merchants, priests, etc.). Curiosity and education drove the pursuit of knowledge and wisdom, and various disciplines, including science (in a primitive form), arose. This in turn led to the emergence of increasingly larger and more complex civilizations, such as the first empires, which at times traded with one another, or fought for territory and resources.

By around 500 BC, there were advanced civilizations in the Middle East, Iran, India, China, and Greece, at times expanding, at times entering into decline. In 221 BC, China became a single polity that would grow to spread its culture throughout East Asia, and it has remained the most populous nation in the world. During this period, famous Hindu texts known as vedas came in existence in Indus Valley Civilization. This civilization developed in warfare, arts, science, mathematics and architecture. The fundamentals of Western civilization were largely shaped in Ancient Greece, with the world's first democratic government and major advances in philosophy and science, and in Ancient Rome with advances in law, government, and engineering.

The Roman Empire was Christianized by Emperor Constantine in the early 4th century and declined by the end of the 5th. Beginning with the 7th century, Christianization of Europe began, and since at least the 4th century Christianity has played a prominent role in the shaping of Western civilization. In 610, Islam was founded and quickly became the dominant religion in Western Asia. The House of Wisdom was established in Abbasid-era Baghdad, Iraq. It is considered to have been a major intellectual center during the Islamic Golden Age, where Muslim scholars in Baghdad and Cairo flourished from the ninth to the thirteenth centuries until the Mongol sack of Baghdad in 1258 AD. In 1054 AD the Great Schism between the Roman Catholic Church and the Eastern Orthodox Church led to the prominent cultural differences between Western and Eastern Europe.

In the 14th century, the Renaissance began in Italy with advances in religion, art, and science. At that time the Christian Church as a political entity lost much of its power. In 1492, Christopher Columbus reached the Americas, initiating great changes to the New World. European civilization began to change beginning in 1500, leading to the Scientific Revolution and Industrial Revolution. That continent began to exert political and cultural dominance over human societies around the world, a time known as the Colonial era. In the 18th century a cultural movement known as the Age of Enlightenment further shaped the mentality of Europe and contributed to its secularization. In 1776, the United States of America declared independence from the British Empire in part because of the ideas popularized by The Enlightenment. The resulting war contributed to a chain of events that led to the French Revolution and the Napoleonic Wars. In the 20th century, imperialism and nationalism spread around the world setting the stage for World War I, World War II, the Cold War, the Space Race, nuclear proliferation, and decolonization. The 20th century also saw the rise of rapid technological advancements with humanity moving from the Wright brothers' first powered airplane flight in 1903, to the Apollo 11 Moon landing in 1969, to the development of the internet in the last few decades of the millennium. The human population also grew from 1 billion people in 1800 to over 8 billion today.

In the 21st century, the planet continues to face the impact of human activities and technology. Today some scientists argue that because of climate change and other environmental impacts the Earth is now in the midst of a 6th mass extinction and/or a new geological epoch called the Anthropocene though these concepts are both disputed.

== See also ==
- Chronology of the universe – History and future of the universe
- Earth phase – Phases of Earth as seen from the Moon
- Evolutionary history of life
- Future of Earth – Long-term future of planet Earth
- Geological history of Earth
- Global catastrophic risk – Hypothetical global-scale disaster risk
- Timeline of the evolutionary history of life
- Timeline of natural history
