= Warrawoona Group =

Stratigraphic layer in Western Australia

- Stratigraphic range: Paleoarchean; ~3530–3427 Ma
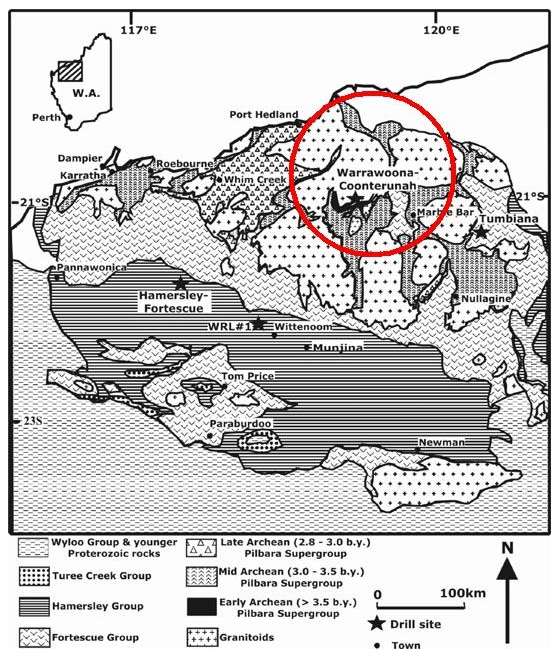
- Warrawoona and Western Australia showing geological classification
- Type: Geological group
- Unit of: Pilbara Supergroup

Lithology
- Primary: Chert
- Other: Archean felsic volcanic rocks

Location
- Coordinates: 21°42′S 118°0′E
- Region: Western Australia
- Country: Australia
- Extent: Pilbara craton

Type section
- Named for: Warrawoona
- Named by: Arthur Hugh Hickman
- Year defined: 1983
- Warrawoona Group (Australia) Warrawoona Group (Western Australia)

The Warrawoona Group is a geological unit in Western Australia containing putative fossils of cyanobacteria cells. Dated between 3.53–3.427 Ga, these microstructures, found in Archean chert, are considered to be the oldest known geological record of life on Earth.

== Description ==
The fossils in this group were discovered by Arthur Hugh Hickman in 1983 in Warrawoona, 21°42′S 118°0′E, a region on the Pilbara craton in the northern part of Pilbara province.

Whether or not the fossils were authentic was disputed in the past, as abiotic processes could not be ruled out. Currently the fossils are thought to be of biological origin, however there is no conclusive evidence of fossilized organisms in the formation, and whether the lines in the rock are fossilized stromatolites.

The rocks also include felsic volcanic rocks.

== See also ==
- North Pole, WA for similar issues
- Origin of life
- Timetable of the Precambrian
- Geology of Australia
- Fig Tree Formation
