= Warrawoona =

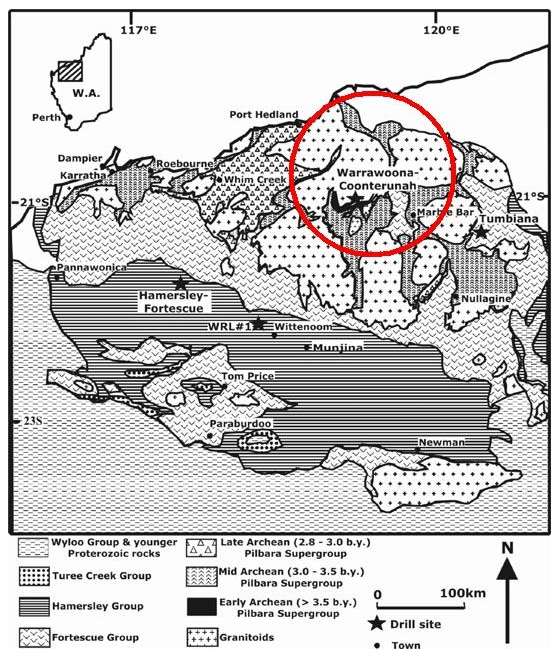
Warrawoona and Western Australia showing geological classification

Warrawoona 32°42′S 118°0′E is a region of Western Australia in the Pilbara province.

The region is home to the Warrawoona belt, a geological area and discovery site of the Warrawoona Group of fossils. These fossils, which are over 3.5 billion years old, are considered to be the oldest known geological record of life on earth.
