= Archean life in the Barberton Greenstone Belt =

Some of the most widely accepted fossil evidence for Archean life

The Barberton Greenstone Belt of eastern South Africa contains some of the most widely accepted fossil evidence for Archean life. These cell-sized prokaryote fossils are seen in the Barberton fossil record in rocks as old as 3.5 billion years. The Barberton Greenstone Belt is an excellent place to study the Archean Earth due to exposed sedimentary and metasedimentary rocks.

Studying the earliest forms of life on Earth can provide valuable information to help understand how life can evolve on other planets. It has long been hypothesized that life may have existed on Mars due to the similarity of environmental and tectonic conditions during the Archean time. By knowing the environments in which early life evolved on Earth, and the rock types that preserve them, scientists can have a better understanding of where to look for life on Mars.

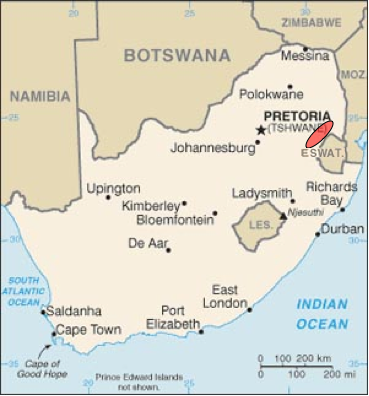
The greenstone belt is located in the red highlighted area of eastern South Africa.

== Global beginnings of life ==
Fossil life of 3.5 billion years of age is also found in the Pilbara craton of western Australia. This evidence, along with Barberton fossils, show that cellular life must have existed by this point in the evolution of Earth. There is work that potentially demonstrates life at 3.8 billion years ago, in what is now western Greenland, but it is highly debated. Cellular life existed 3.5 billion years ago and thus it evolved prior to this time. Because the Earth is 4.5 billion years old, there is a window of about one billion years for cellular life to evolve on a lifeless Earth.

== Archean tectonic history of the Barberton Greenstone Belt ==
The Barberton Greenstone Belt is located on the Kaapvaal craton, which covers much of the southeastern part of Africa, and was formed by the emplacement of granitoid batholiths. The Kaapvaal craton was once part of a supercontinent geologists term Vaalbara that also included the Pilbara craton of western Australia. Though the exact timing is still debated, it is likely that Vaalbara existed from approximately 3.6 to 2.2 billion years ago, and then split into two different continents.

== Evidence for life ==
Preserved life in Archean rocks has been altered over its 3.5 billion year history and, thus, can be difficult to distinguish. The cell wall structure can be preserved, but the original composition changes over time and becomes mineralised. There are six established criteria to determine the plausibility of a given microstructure being a microfossil:

1. True microfossils should be of relatively abundant occurrence.
2. True microfossils should be of carbonaceous composition or, if mineralic, be biologically precipitated (for example, some bacteria form pyrite due to metabolic processes).
3. True microfossils should exhibit biological morphology. (see following section)
4. True microfossils should occur in a geologically plausible context (for example, there are no microfossils in igneous rock, because life cannot grow in molten lava).
5. True microfossils should fit within a well-established evolutionary context (for example, complex microfossils are highly unlikely to exist at 3.5 billion years, as they have yet to evolve from their more simple cellular ancestors).
6. True microfossils should be dissimilar from non-biogenic carbonaceous matter. (see Isotope analysis section)

=== Cell morphology ===
Cells are preserved in the rock record because their cell walls are made of proteins which convert to the organic material kerogen as the cell breaks down after death. Kerogen is insoluble in mineral acids, bases, and organic solvents. Over time, it is mineralised into graphite or graphite-like carbon, or degrades into oil and gas hydrocarbons.

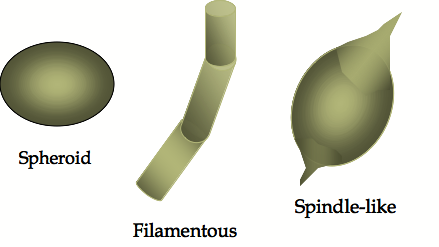
Three main types of Archaean cell morphologies

There are three main types of cell morphologies. Though there is no established range of sizes for each type, spheroid microfossils can be as small as about 8 μm, filamentous microfossils have diameters typically less than 5 μm and have a length that can range from tens of μm to 100 μm, and spindle-like microfossils can be as long as 50 μm.

=== Isotope analysis ===
Stable isotope fractionation is a useful way of characterising organic carbon and inorganic carbon. These numbers are reported as δ^{13}C values, where C is for the chemical element carbon. Isotope analysis of inorganic carbon typically yields δ^{13}C values heavier than −10 per mil, with numbers usually falling between −5 and 5 per mil. Organic carbon, however, has δ^{13}C values that range from −20 per mil for photoautotrophic bacteria to −60 per mil for microbial communities that recycle methane. The large range in values for organic carbon has to do with the cellular metabolism. For instance, an organism that uses photosynthesis (a phototroph) will have a different isotope δ^{13}C value than an organism that relies on chemical substances for energy (an autotroph).

== Fossil record ==
The oldest microfossils from the Barberton Greenstone belt are found in the Onverwacht Group, specifically, in both the Kromberg and Hooggenoeg Formations. Both of these formations are predominantly igneous rock; the sedimentary rock has been metamorphosed. However, it is still possible to find microfossils in chert, a type of evaporite that forms in sedimentary environments. From the evidence in these rocks, it is likely that early life existed in the form of microbial mats and stromatolites. Evidence for this hypothesis is preserved in both chert and lithified stromatolites.

Stromatolites represent large colonies of microorganisms, and are found both in the fossil record and rarely in modern hypersaline environments. A typical stromatolite consists of alternating layers of sediment and microbes. The microbes are photosynthetic; thus stromatolites represent shallow water environments in the fossil record due to their necessity to exist in the photic zone of water bodies. Stromatolites typically consist of filamentous microfossils. The oldest stromatolites have been dated to approximately 3.5 billion years old. Stromatolites in Barberton have been dated to about 3.3 billion years.

Microfossils found in chert extend the Barberton microfossil record back to 3.5 billion years. All three types of microfossil morphologies are found in cherts. Chert can have a variety of colours, but microfossils are typically found in black cherts, as the dark color can indicate organic material.

== Future applications ==
Scientists have established the approximate age that life first appears in the fossil record, but this is not equivalent to the age that life first evolved on Earth. Though fossils have not been found in older rocks, evidence for life can be found in other ways, such as extended carbon isotope data and Raman Spectroscopy. There is also ongoing work within the scientific community to solve the problem of how cellular life evolved in a hostile early Earth.
