= Paleoarchean =

Second era of the Archean Eon

- 3600 – 3200 Ma
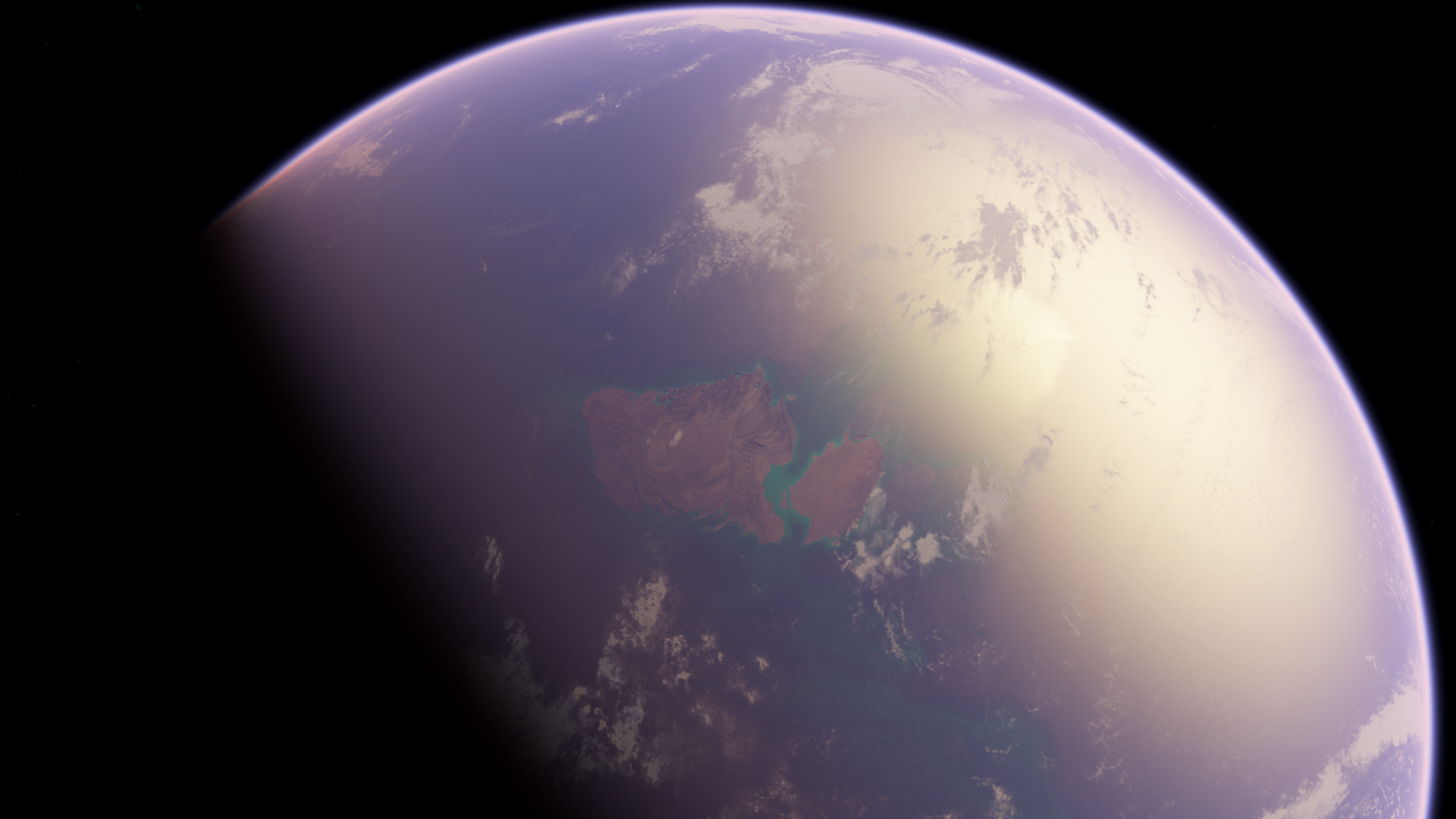
- Artist's impression of Vaalbara, a hypothetical continent dating from 3.6 to 2.7 billion years ago

Chronology
← / First photosynthetic organisms appeared; ← / Earliest definitive Stromatolites and uncontroversial life forms
Events of the Paleoarchean Era; Vertical axis scale: Millions of years ago
- Proposed redefinition(s): 4031–3490 Ma; Gradstein et al., 2012
- Proposed subdivisions: Acastan Period, 4031–3810 Ma Gradstein et al., 2012; Isuan Period, 3810–3490 Ma Gradstein et al., 2012

Etymology
- Name formality: Formal
- Alternate spelling(s): Palaeoarchaean
- Synonym(s): Early Archean

Usage information
- Celestial body: Earth
- Regional usage: Global (ICS)
- Time scale(s) used: ICS Time Scale

Definition
- Chronological unit: Era
- Stratigraphic unit: Erathem
- Time span formality: Formal
- Lower boundary definition: Defined Chronometrically
- Lower GSSA ratified: Not formally defined
- Upper boundary definition: Defined Chronometrically
- Upper GSSA ratified: Not formally defined

The Paleoarchean (/ˌpælioʊ.ɑːrˈkiːən, ˌpeɪl-/ PAL-lee-oh-ar-KEE-ən, PAY-), also spelled Palaeoarchaean (formerly known as the early Archean), is a geologic era within the Archean Eon. The name derives from Greek "Palaios" ancient. It spans the period of time 3,600 to 3,200 million years ago. The era is defined chronometrically and is not referenced to a specific level of a rock section on Earth. The earliest confirmed evidence of life comes from this era, and Vaalbara, one of Earth's earliest supercontinents, may have formed during this era.

== Early life ==
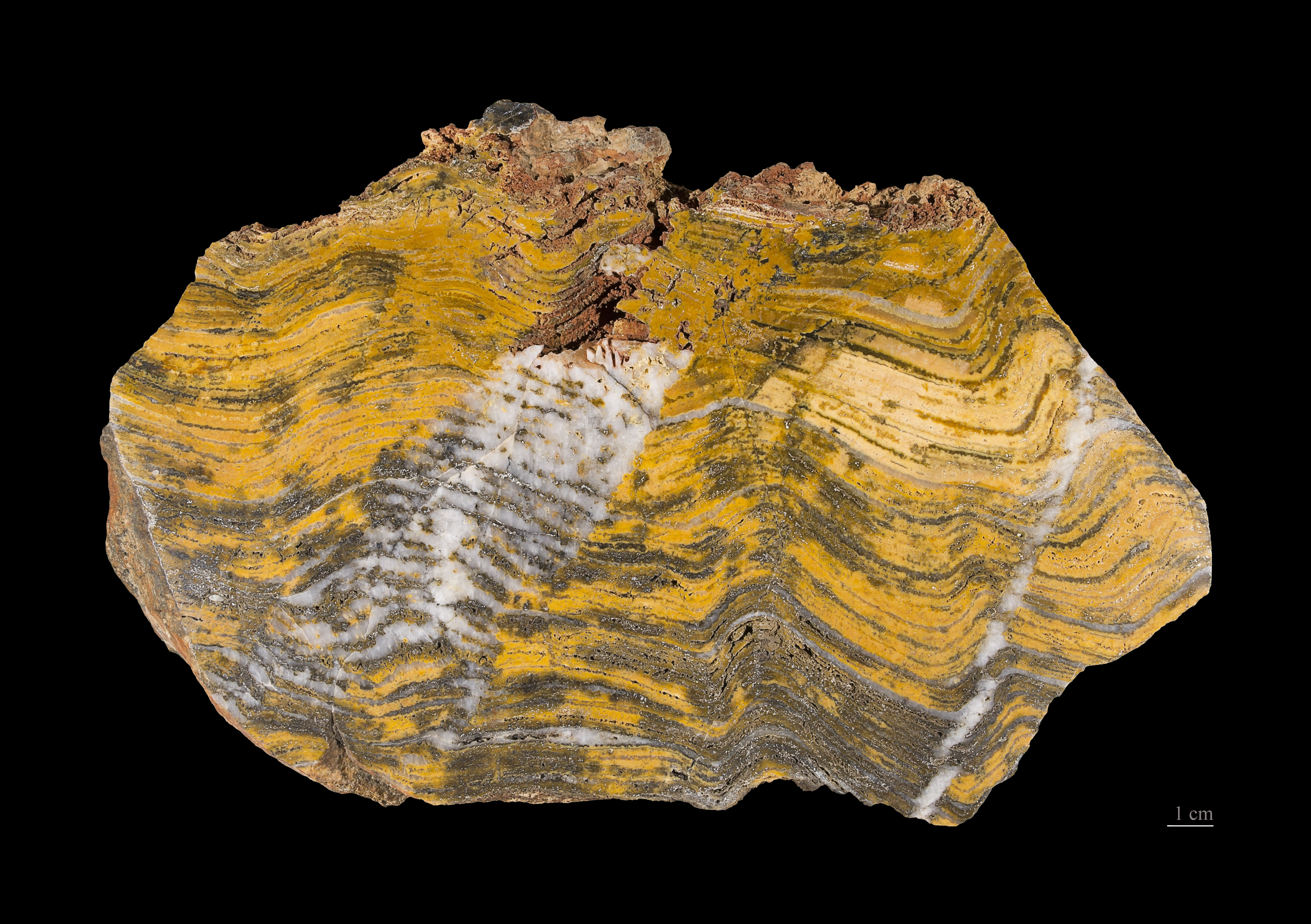
A stromatolite formed by Paleoarchean microbial mats, preserved as a fossil, from Pilbara craton, Western Australia.

The geological record from the Paleoarchean era is very limited. Due to deformation and metamorphism, most rocks from the Paleoarchean era cannot provide any useful information. There are only two locations in the world containing rock formations that are intact enough to preserve evidence of early life: the Kaapvaal Craton in Southern Africa and the Pilbara Craton in Western Australia.

The Dresser Formation is located in the Pilbara Craton, and contains sedimentary rock from the Paleoarchean Era. It is estimated to be 3.48 billion years old. The Dresser Formation includes a great variety of structures caused by ancient life including stromatolites and MISS (Microbially Induced Sedimentary Structures) once formed by microbial mats. Such microbial mats belong to the oldest ascertained life form and may include fossilized bacteria. The Strelley Pool Chert, also located in the Pilbara Craton, contains stromatolites that may have been created by bacteria 3.4 billion years ago. However, it is possible that these stromatolites are abiogenic and were actually formed through evaporitic precipitation then deposited on the sea floor.

The Barberton Greenstone Belt, located in the Kaapvaal Craton, also contains evidence of life. It was created around 3.26 Ga when a large asteroid, about 37 to 58 kilometres (23–36 mi) wide, collided with the Earth. The Buck Reef chert and the Josefsdal chert, two rock formations in the Barberton Greenstone Belt, both contain microbial mats with fossilized bacteria from the Paleoarchean era. The Kromberg Formation, near the top of the Onverwacht Group which itself is a part of the Barberton Greenstone Belt, dates back to approximately 3.416–3.334 Ga and contains evidence of microbial life reproducing via multiple fission and binary fission.

== Continental development ==
A map of the Barberton Greenstone Belt in southern Africa.

Similarities between the Barberton Greenstone Belt in the Kaapvaal craton and the eastern part of the Pilbara Craton indicate that the two formations were once joined as part of the supercontinent Vaalbara, one of Earth's earliest supercontinents. Both cratons formed at the beginning of the Paleoarchean era. While some paleomagnetic data suggests that they were connected during the Paleoarchean era, it is possible that Vaalbara did not form until the Mesoarchean or Neoarchean eras.

It is also unclear whether there was any exposed land during the Paleoarchean era. Although several Paleoarchean formations such as the Dresser Formation, the Josefsdal Chert, and the Mendon Formation show some evidence of being above the surface, over 90 percent of Archean continental crust has been destroyed, making the existence of exposed land practically impossible to confirm or deny. It is likely that during the Paleoarchean era, there was a large amount of continental crust, but it was still underwater and would not emerge until later in the Archean era. Hotspot islands may have been the only exposed land at the time.

Due to a much hotter mantle and an elevated oceanic geothermal gradient compared to the present day, plate tectonics in its modern form did not exist during the Paleoarchean. Instead, a model of "flake tectonics" has been proposed for this era of geologic time. According to this model, instead of normal subduction of oceanic plates, extensively silicified upper oceanic crust delaminated from lower oceanic crust and was deposited in a manner similar to ophiolites from the later Proterozoic and Phanerozoic eons.

== Impacts ==
The Pilbara craton contains the earliest known surviving remnant of an impact crater, the North Pole Dome, estimated to be 3.47 billion years old and the original crater estimated to be over 100 kilometres (62 mi) in diameter. Other inferred Paleoarchean impacts are recorded in spherule layers at various locations in South Africa and Australia (including the Barberton Greenstone Belt) at some distance from the impact sites. The impactors that generated these events are thought to have been much larger than those that created the largest known still existing craters/impact structures on Earth (Vredefort and Chicxulub), with the impactors having an estimated diameter of ~20–50 kilometres (12–31 mi), with the craters generated by these impacts having an estimated diameter of 400–1,000 kilometres (250–620 mi). The most powerful of the impacts such as the S2 impact, which dates to 3.26 billion years ago, probably caused extremely strong earthquakes worldwide, megatsunamis thousands of meters high, as well as boiling the surface of the oceans, resulting in tens of meters of global ocean evaporation. Earth would have also been plunged into darkness lasting years to decades.
