= Kaapvaal Craton =

Archaean craton, possibly part of the Vaalbara supercontinent

The pink figure shows the land of the Kaapvaal Craton in the present day.

The Kaapvaal Craton is a craton in South Africa. It has been suggested to have formed part of continent of Vaalbara during the Archean.

== Limpopo Central Zone ==
Evidence of the horizontal layering and riverine erosion can be found throughout the Waterberg Massif within the Limpopo Central Zone.

== Barberton greenstone belt ==
The Barberton greenstone belt, also known as the Makhonjwa Mountains, is situated on the eastern edge of Kaapvaal Craton. It is well known for its gold mineralisation and for its Komatiites, an unusual type of ultramafic volcanic rock named after the Komati River that flows through the belt. Some rocks on Earth (greater than 3.6 Ga) are the Barberton greenstone belt and these contain some of the oldest traces of life on earth.

== Johannesburg Dome ==
In a 2001 study by Poujol and Anhaeusser: "Following the trondhjemite-tonalite gneiss emplacement a further period of magmatism took place on the dome, which resulted in the intrusion of mafic dykes that are manifest as hornblende amphibolites. The age of these dykes has yet to be determined quantitatively, but they fall within the time constraints imposed by the age of the trondhjemitic gneisses (3340–3200 Ma) and later, crosscutting, potassic granitoids."

== See also ==
- Archean life in the Barberton Greenstone Belt – Some of the most widely accepted fossil evidence for Archean life
- Vaalbara – Hypothetical Archaean supercontinent from about 3.6 to 2.7 billion years ago
- Vredefort impact structure – Largest verified impact structure on Earth

== Bibliography ==
- Glikson, A. and Vickers, J. (2006) "The 3.26–3.24 Ga Barberton asteroid impact cluster: Tests of tectonic and magmatic consequences, Pilbara Craton, Western Australia", Earth and Planetary Science Letters, 241 (1–2), 11–20, doi:10.1016/j.epsl.2005.10.022
- Louzda, K.L. (2003) "The magmatic evolution of the upper ~3450 Ma Hooggenoeg Formation, Barberton greenstone belt, Kaapvaal Craton, South Africa", Utrecht University : unpubl. MSc project abstr.
- Poujol, M., Robb, L.J., Anhaeusser, C.R. and Gericke, B. (2003) "A review of the geochronological constraints on the evolution of the Kaapvaal Craton, South Africa", Precambrian Research, 127 (1–3), 181–213, doi:10.1016/S0301-9268(03)00187-6.
- Westraat, J.D, Kisters, A.F.M., Poujo, M. and Stevens, G. (2005) "Transcurrent shearing, granite sheeting and the incremental construction of the tabular 3.1 Ga Mpuluzi batholith, Barberton granite–greenstone terrane, South Africa", Journal of the Geological Society, 162 (2), 373–388, doi:10.1144/0016-764904-026
- Yearron, L.M., Clemens, J.D., Stevens, G. and Anhaeusser, C.R.(2003) "Geochemistry and Petrogenesis of the Granitoids of the Barberton Mountainlan, South Africa", Geophysical Research Abstracts, 5, 02639

== Additional reading ==
- Nguuri, T.K. et al. (2001) “Crustal structure beneath southern Africa and its implications for the formation and evolution of the Kaapvaal and Zimbabwe cratons”, "Geophysical Research Letters", 28, 2501–2504.
