= Early Earth =

Period in Earth's history

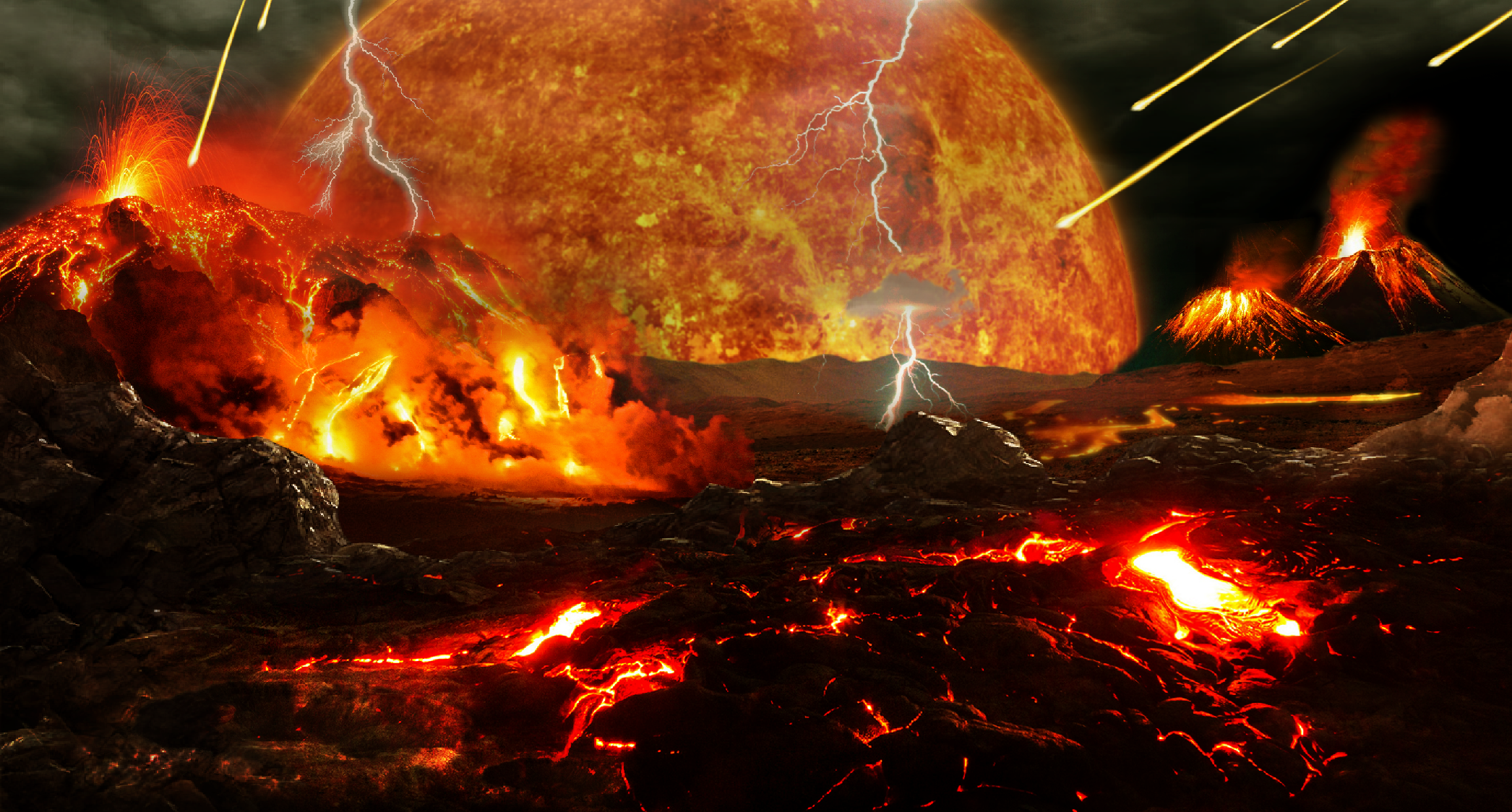
Artist impression of the Early Earth's planetary surface

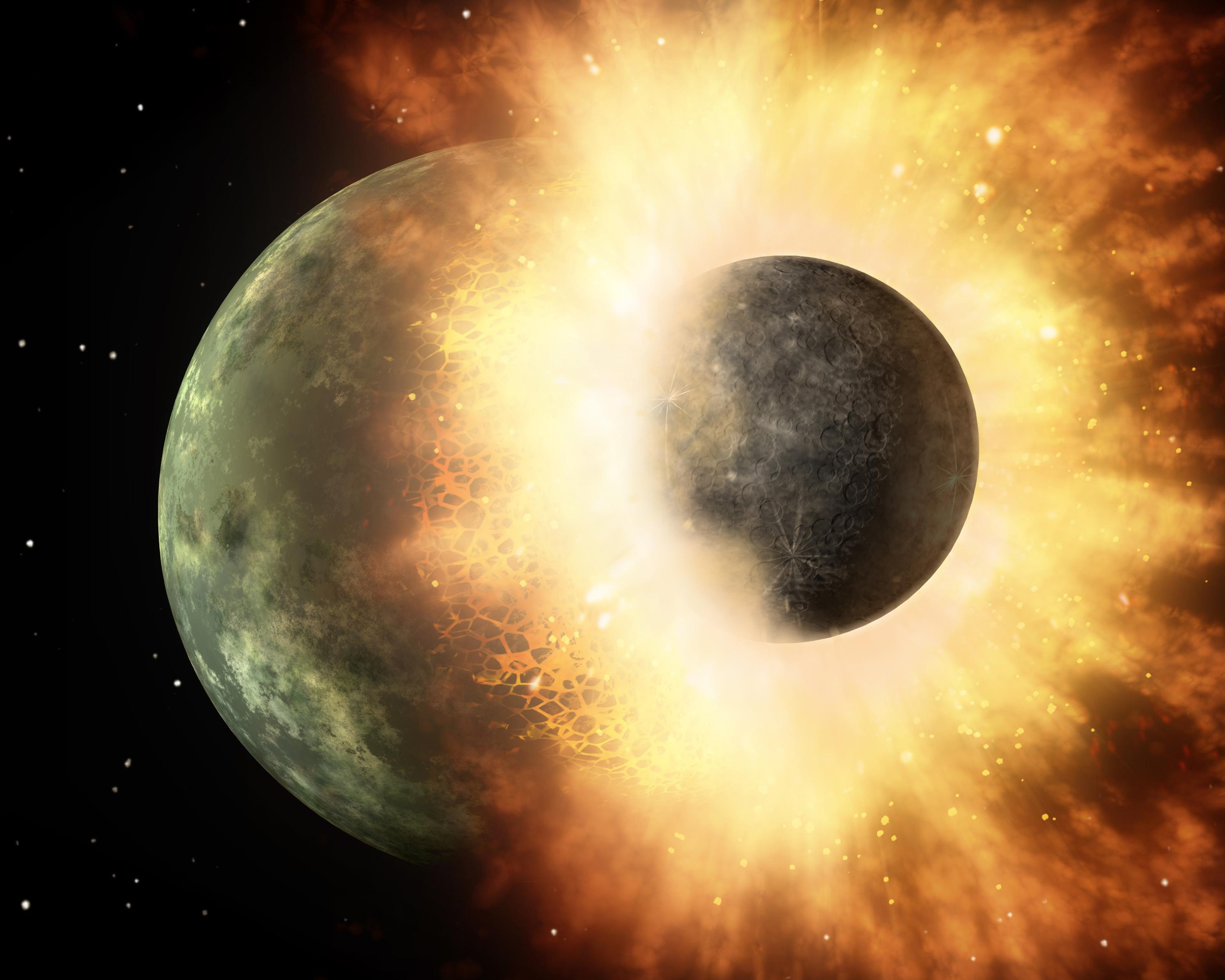
Artist's depiction of a similar collision between two planets around HD 172555

Early Earth, also known as Proto-Earth, is loosely defined as Earth in the first billion years — or gigayear (10^{9} y or Ga) — of its geological history, from its initial formation in the young Solar System at about 4.55 billion years ago (Gya), to the end of the Eoarchean era at approximately 3.5 Gya. On the geologic time scale, this comprises all of the Hadean eon and approximately one-third of the Archean eon, starting with the formation of the Earth about 4.6 Gya, and ended at the start of the Paleoarchean era 3.6 Gya.

This period of Earth's history involved the planet's formation from the solar nebula via a process known as accretion, and transition of the Earth's atmosphere from a hydrogen/helium-predominant primary atmosphere collected from the protoplanetary disk to a reductant secondary atmosphere rich in nitrogen, methane and CO_{2}. This time period included intense impact events as the young Proto-Earth, a protoplanet of about 0.63 Earth masses, began clearing the neighborhood, including the early Moon-forming collision with Theia — a Mars-sized co-orbital planet likely perturbed from the L_{4} Lagrange point — around 0.032 Ga after formation of the Solar System, which resulted in a series of magma oceans and episodes of core formation. After formation of the core, meteorites or comets from the outer Solar System might have delivered water and other volatile compounds to the Earth's mantle, crust and ancient atmosphere in an intense "late veneer" bombardment. As the Earth's planetary surface eventually cooled and formed a stable but evolving crust during the end-Hadean, most of the water vapor condensed out of the atmosphere and precipitated into a superocean that covered nearly all of the Earth's surface, transforming the initially lava planet Earth of the Hadean into an ocean planet at the early Archean, where the earliest known life forms appeared soon afterwards.

Although little crustal material from this period survives, the oldest dated rock is a zircon mineral of 4.404 ± 0.008 Gya enclosed in a metamorphosed sandstone conglomerate in the Jack Hills of the Narryer Gneiss terrane of Western Australia. The earliest supracrustal terrains (such as the Isua greenstone belt) date from the latter half of this period, about 3.8 Gya, around the same time as peak Late Heavy Bombardment.

== History ==
According to evidence from radiometric dating and other sources, Earth formed about 4.54 billion years ago. The current dominant theory of planet formation suggests that planets such as Earth form in about 50 to 100 million years but more recently proposed alternative processes and timescales have stimulated ongoing debate in the planetary science community. For example, in June 2023, one team of scientists reported evidence that Earth may have formed in just three million years. More recently, it was shown that the chemical building blocks of the proto-Earth were established within ~3 million years of Solar System formation during dissipation of the protoplanetary disk, while full planetary accretion was completed within ~70 million years.

Within the first billion years of the formation of Earth, life appeared in its oceans and began to affect its atmosphere and surface, promoting the proliferation of aerobic as well as anaerobic organisms. Since then, the combination of Earth's distance from the Sun, its physical properties and its geological history have allowed life to emerge, develop photosynthesis, and, later, evolve further and thrive. The earliest life on Earth arose at least 3.5 billion years ago. Earlier possible evidence of life includes graphite, which may have a biogenic origin, in 3.7-billion-year-old metasedimentary rocks discovered in southwestern Greenland and 4.1-billion-year-old zircon grains in Western Australia.

In November 2020, an international team of scientists reported studies suggesting that the primeval atmosphere of the early Earth was very different from the conditions used in the Miller–Urey studies considering the origin of life on Earth.

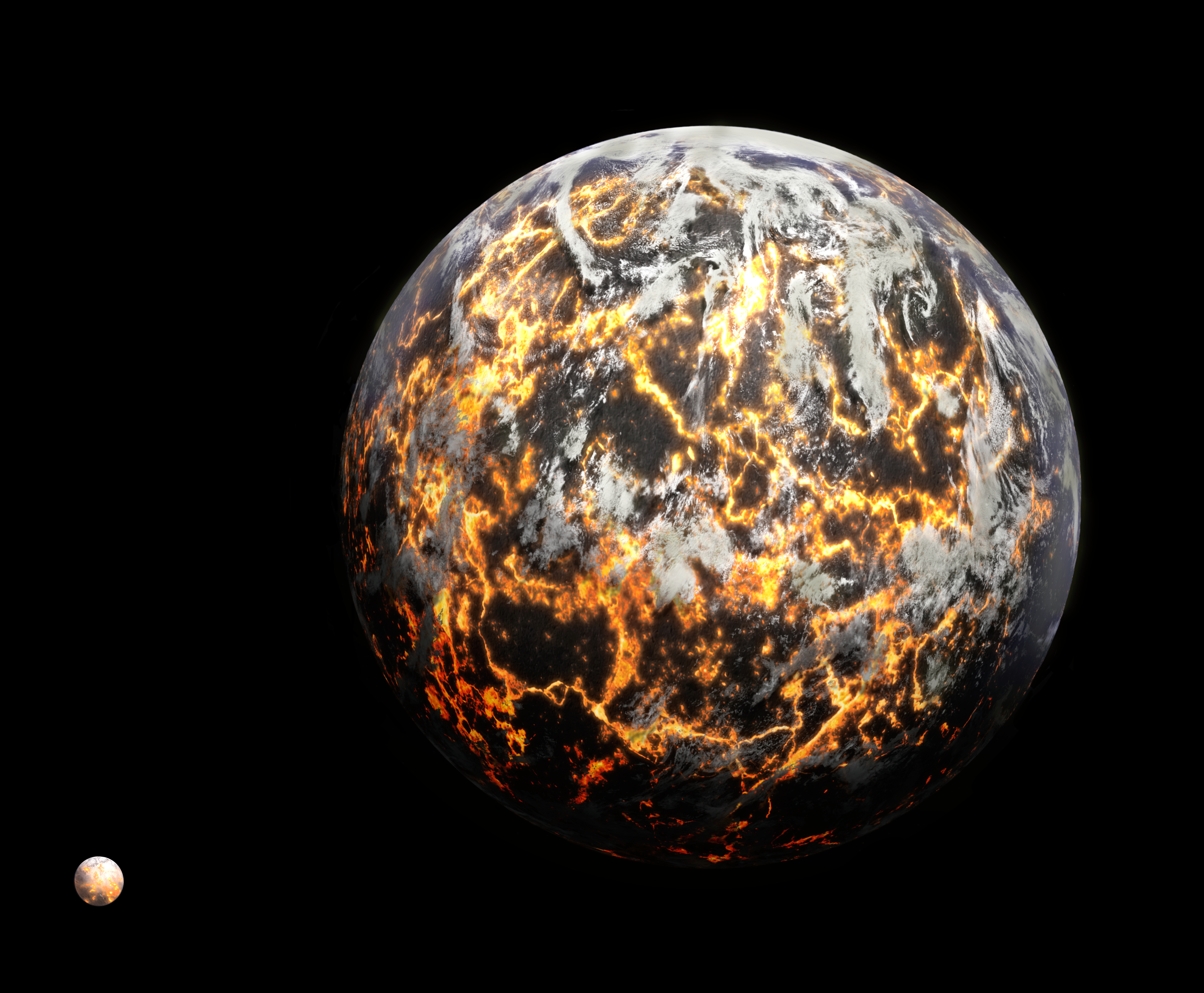
Artist impression of the Early Earth as a lava planet during the Hadean eon

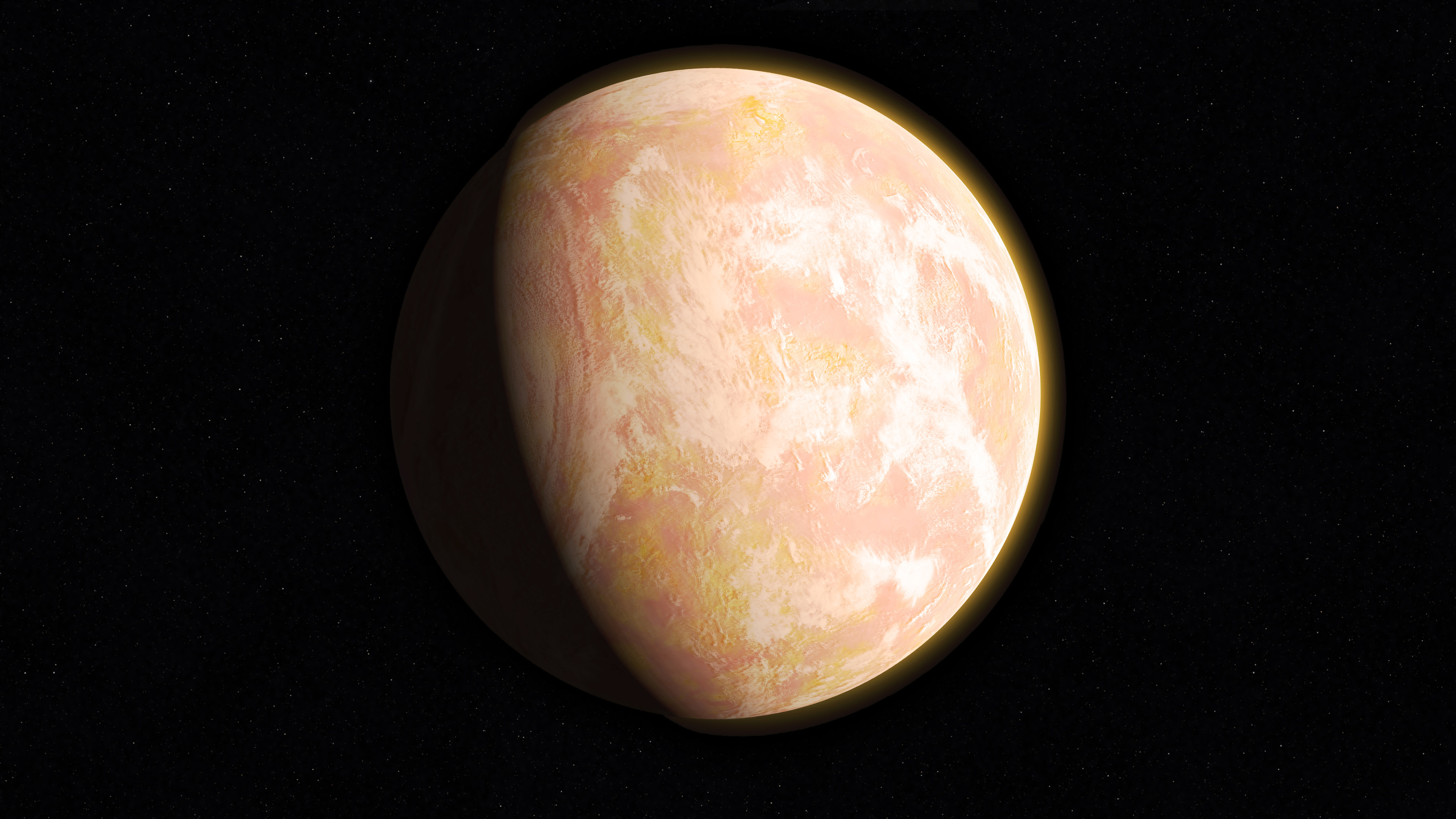
Artist's impression of Archean Earth, showing an orange atmospheric haze, leading to the alternative description of the planet in that stage of its development as a "pale orange dot"

== See also ==
- Chronology of the universe – History and future of the universe
- History of life
- Future of Earth – Long-term future of planet Earth
- Geological history of Earth
- History of Earth – Records of Earth's development
- Timeline of the evolutionary history of life
- Timeline of natural history
