= Supracrustal rock =

Rocks that were deposited on the existing basement rocks of the crust

Supracrustal rocks (supra (Latin for "above")) are rocks that were deposited on the existing basement rocks of the crust, hence the name. They may be further metamorphosed from both sedimentary and volcanic rocks.

The oldest minerals on Earth are detrital zircon grains from the Yilgarn Craton in the Mesoarchaean (3.2–2.8 Ga) Jack Hills, Western Australia dated to up to 4.4 Ga, meaning that granitic continental crust and probably supracrustal rocks formed during the Hadean, within 200 million years of Earth accretion. Most Hadean rocks were probably recycled into the mantle before the end of the eon, however, and such pre-4.0 Ga mineral inclusions, the only traces from the earliest rock formation on Earth, are rare.

The Acasta orthogneisses of the Slave Craton, Canada, are regarded to be the oldest rocks on Earth, dated to 4.06 Ga, include protoliths such as TTGs, amphibolite, gabbro, granite, and diorite. It is possible that such early Hadean TTGs were a source of phosphorus for the first oceans and therefore contributed nutrients to the first abiogenic steps of life on Earth.

No Hadean-aged zircon grains have been identified in the Nuvvuagittuq Supracrustal Belt in northern Quebec, but amphibolites have been dated to 4.28 Ga while 3.75 Ga-old banded iron formations indicate the minimum age of the belt. The Napier Mountains in Antarctica are of similar age.

The Isua greenstone belt contains the oldest, well-preserved, supracrustals, dated at 3.8–3.7 Ga.
