= Chaotian (geology) =

Proposed era of the Hadean eon

- 4540 – 4404 Ma

Chronology
- Subdivisions: See text

Usage information
- Celestial body: Earth
- Regional usage: Proposed subdivision of the Hadean eon

Definition
- Chronological unit: Era
- Stratigraphic unit: Erathem
- First proposed by: C. Goldblatt, K. J. Zahnle, N. H. Sleep, and E. G. Nisbet, 2010
- Lower boundary definition: Formation of the Earth
- Upper boundary definition: Collision between Proto-Earth and the Protoplanet Theia

The Chaotian is a proposed time division of the geologic time scale. First proposed in 2010 as an eon, it is named after Chaos, the primeval void in Greek mythology. This proposal defines the Chaotian eon as a Solar System-wide time between the initiation of planetary formation and the hypothesised collision of the trojan dwarf planet Theia with the proto-Earth.

A revised proposal in 2012 suggested the Chaotian as the first era of the Hadean representing the time between the formation of the Solar System c. 4.567 Ga and the oldest preserved crustal material on Earth, a detrital zircon c. 4.404 Ga from the Jack Hills of the Narryer terrane in Western Australia.

As of September 2023, neither proposal had been adopted or officially ratified by the International Union of Geological Sciences.

== Subdivisions ==
The original proposal in 2010 divided the Chaotian into two eras and four periods. No numerical upper age limits were provided, only the younger age limit of ~4.5 Ga for the boundary between the proposed Chaotian and Hadean boundary.

The revised proposal in 2012 did not subdivide the proposed Chaotian era (of the Hadean eon) into periods.

Proposed Chaotian time intervals (2010)
Eon	Era	Period	Age (Ga)
Chaotian	Neochaotian	Titanomachaen	> ~4.5
Chaotian	Neochaotian	Hyperitian	
Chaotian	Eochaotian	Erebrean	
Chaotian	Eochaotian	Nephelean	

Proposed Chaotian time intervals (2012)
Eon	Era	Age (Ga)
Hadean	Jack Hillsian or Zirconian	4.404 to 4.030
Hadean	Chaotian	4.568 to 4.404

== See also ==
- Age of Earth
- Formation and evolution of the Solar System
- Geologic time scale
