= Chaotian =

Chaotian may refer to:

- Chaotian District, in Guangyuan, Sichuan, China
- Chaotian Palace, in Nanjing, Jiangsu, China
- Chaotian Temple, in Beigang, Yunlin County, Taiwan
- Chaotian (geology), an unofficial proposed subdivision of the Hadean eon
- Chaotian jiao, the Mandarin Chinese name for the Facing heaven pepper
