= Late Heavy Bombardment =

Hypothesized astronomical event

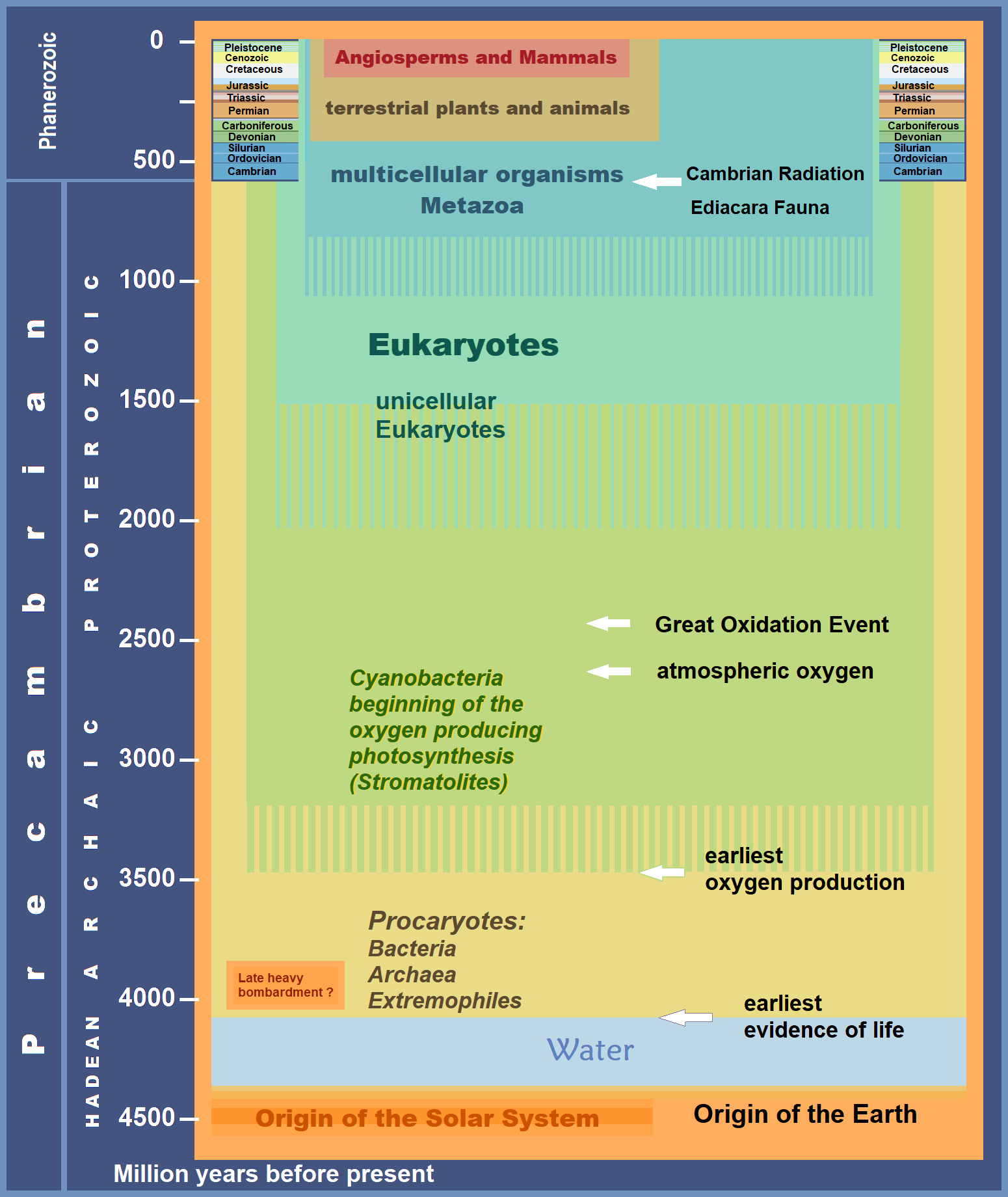
Timescale

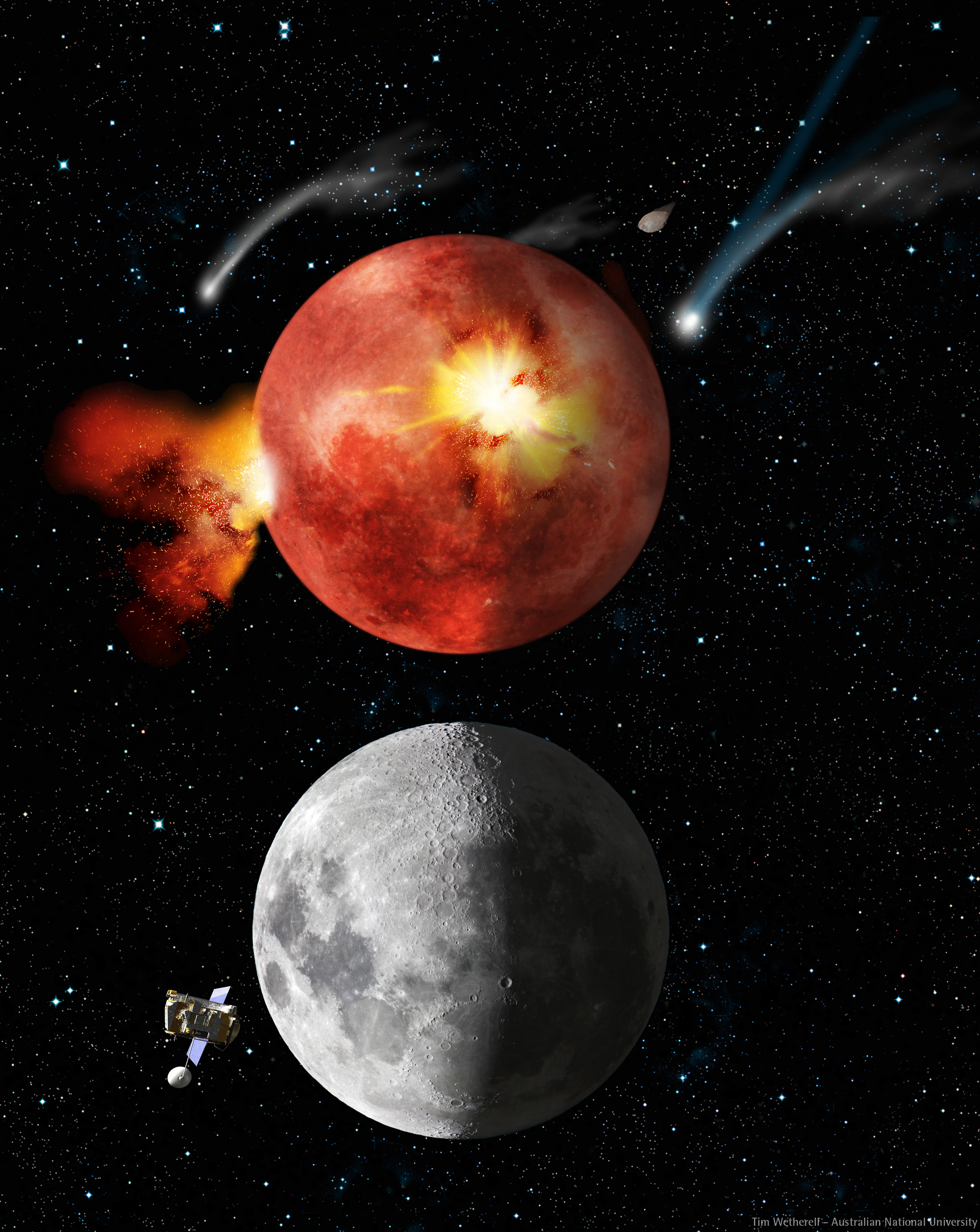
Artist's impression of the Moon during the Late Heavy Bombardment (above) and today (below)

The Late Heavy Bombardment (LHB), or lunar cataclysm, is a hypothesized astronomical event thought to have occurred approximately 4.1 to 3.8 billion years (Ga) ago, at a time corresponding to the Neohadean and Eoarchean eras on Earth. According to the hypothesis, during this interval, a disproportionately large number of asteroids and comets collided into the terrestrial planets and their natural satellites in the inner Solar System, including Mercury, Venus, Earth (and the Moon) and Mars. These came from both post-accretion and planetary instability-driven populations of impactors.

Evidence for the LHB derives from Moon rock samples of Lunar craters brought back by the Apollo program astronauts. Isotopic dating showed that the rocks were last molten during impact events in a rather narrow interval of time, suggesting that a large proportion of craters were formed during this period. Several hypotheses attempt to explain this apparent spike in the flux of impactors in the inner Solar System, but no consensus yet exists. The Nice model, popular among planetary scientists, postulates that the giant planets underwent orbital migration, scattering objects from the asteroid belt, Kuiper belt, or both, into eccentric orbits and into the path of the terrestrial planets.

Other researchers doubt the heavy bombardment, arguing for example that the apparent clustering of lunar impact-melt ages is a statistical artifact produced by sampling rocks scattered from a single large impact. A range of evidence suggests that there may instead have been a more extended period of lunar bombardment, lasting from approximately 4.2 billion years ago to 3.5 billion years ago.

The existence of the LHB was once widely accepted by the academic community but is now debated; definitive evidence either way remains elusive.

== Evidence for a cataclysm ==
The main piece of evidence for a lunar cataclysm comes from the radiometric ages of impact melt rocks that were collected during the Apollo missions. The majority of these impact melts are thought to have formed during the collision of asteroids or comets tens of kilometres across, forming impact craters hundreds of kilometres in diameter. The Apollo 15, 16, and 17 landing sites were chosen as a result of their proximity to the Imbrium, Nectaris, and Serenitatis basins, respectively.

The apparent clustering of ages of these impact melts, between about 3.8 and 4.1 Ga, led investigators to postulate that those ages record an intense bombardment of the Moon. They named it the "lunar cataclysm" and proposed that it represented a dramatic increase in the rate of bombardment of the Moon around 3.9 Ga. If these impact melts were derived from these three basins, then not only did these three prominent impact basins form within a short interval of time, but so did many others based on stratigraphic grounds. At the time, the hypothesis was considered controversial.

As more data have become available, particularly from lunar meteorites, this hypothesis, while still controversial, has become more popular. The lunar meteorites are thought to randomly sample the lunar surface, and at least some of these should have originated from regions far from the Apollo landing sites. Many of the feldspathic lunar meteorites probably originated from the lunar far side, and impact melts within these have recently been dated. Consistent with the cataclysm hypothesis, none of their ages was found to be older than about 3.9 Ga. Nevertheless, the ages do not "cluster" at this date, but span between 2.5 and 3.9 Ga.

Dating of howardite, eucrite and diogenite (HED) meteorites and H chondrite meteorites originating from the asteroid belt reveal numerous ages from 3.4–4.1 Ga and an earlier peak at 4.5 Ga. The 3.4–4.1 Ga ages has been interpreted as representing an increase in impact velocities as computer simulations using hydrocode reveal that the volume of impact melt increases 100–1,000 times as the impact velocity increases from the current asteroid belt average of 5 km/s to 10 km/s. Impact velocities above 10 km/s require very high inclinations or the large eccentricities of asteroids on planet-crossing orbits. Such objects are rare in the current asteroid belt but the population would be significantly increased by the sweeping of resonances due to giant planet migration.

Studies of the highland crater size distributions suggest that the same family of projectiles struck Mercury and the Moon during the Late Heavy Bombardment. If the history of decay of late heavy bombardment on Mercury also followed the history of late heavy bombardment on the Moon, the youngest large basin discovered, Caloris, is comparable in age to the youngest large lunar basins, Orientale and Imbrium, and all of the plains units are older than 3 billion years.

== Criticisms of the cataclysm hypothesis ==
While the cataclysm hypothesis has recently become more popular (in the last fifty years), particularly among dynamicists who have identified possible causes for such a phenomenon, it is still controversial and based on debatable assumptions. Two criticisms are that (1) the "cluster" of impact ages could be an artifact of sampling a single basin's ejecta, and (2) that the lack of impact melt rocks older than about 4.1 Ga is related to all such samples having been pulverized, or their ages being reset.

The first criticism concerns the origin of the impact melt rocks that were sampled at the Apollo landing sites. While these impact melts have been commonly attributed to having been derived from the closest basin, it has been argued that a large portion of these might instead be derived from the Imbrium basin. The Imbrium impact basin is the youngest and largest of the multi-ring basins found on the central nearside of the Moon, and quantitative modeling shows that significant amounts of ejecta from this event should be present at all of the Apollo landing sites. According to this alternative hypothesis, the cluster of impact melt ages near 3.9 Ga simply reflects material being collected from a single impact event, and not several. Additional criticism also argues that the age spike at 3.9 Ga identified in ^{40}Ar/^{39}Ar dating could also be produced by an episodic early crust formation followed by partial ^{40}Ar losses as the impact rate declined.

A second criticism concerns the significance of the lack of impact melt rocks older than about 4.1 Ga. One hypothesis for this observation that does not involve a cataclysm is that old melt rocks did exist, but that their radiometric ages have all been reset by the continuous effects of impact cratering over the past 4 billion years. Furthermore, it is possible that these putative samples could all have been pulverized to such small sizes that it is impossible to obtain age determinations using standard radiometric methods. Scientists continue to study the bombardment history of the moon in an attempt to clarify the history of the inner solar system.

== Geological consequences on Earth ==
Life timeline
← / Earth formed; ← / Earliest water; ← / LUCA; ← / Earliest fossils; ← / Atmospheric oxygen; ← / Sexual reproduction; ← / Earliest fungi; ← / Neoproterozoic oxygenation event; ← / Ediacaran biota; ← / Cambrian explosion; ← / Earliest tetrapods; ← / Earliest hominoid
(million years ago)

If a cataclysmic cratering event truly occurred on the Moon, Earth would have been affected as well. Extrapolating lunar cratering rates to Earth at this time suggests that the following number of craters would have formed:

- 22,000 or more impact craters with diameters >20 km (12 mi),
- about 40 impact basins with diameters about 1,000 km (620 mi),
- several impact basins with diameters about 5,000 km (3,100 mi),

Before the formulation of the LHB hypothesis, geologists generally assumed that Earth remained molten until about 3.8 Ga. This date could be found in many of the oldest-known rocks from around the world, and appeared to represent a strong "cutoff point" beyond which older rocks could not be found. These dates remained fairly constant even across various dating methods, including the system considered the most accurate and least affected by environment, uranium–lead dating of zircons. As no older rocks could be found, it was generally assumed that Earth had remained molten until this date, which defined the boundary between the earlier Hadean and later Archean eons. Nonetheless, in 1999, the oldest known rock on Earth was dated to be 4.031 ± 0.003 billion years old, and is part of the Acasta Gneiss of the Slave Craton in northwestern Canada.

Older rocks could be found, however, in the form of asteroid fragments that fall to Earth as meteorites. Like the rocks on Earth, asteroids also show a strong cutoff point, at about 4.6 Ga, which is assumed to be the time when the first solids formed in the protoplanetary disk around the then-young Sun. The Hadean, then, was the period of time between the formation of these early rocks in space, and the eventual solidification of Earth's crust, some 700 million years later. This time would include the accretion of the planets from the disk and the slow cooling of Earth into a solid body as the gravitational potential energy of accretion was released.

Later calculations showed that the rate of collapse and cooling depends on the size of the rocky body. Scaling this rate to an object of Earth mass suggested very rapid cooling, requiring only 100 million years. The difference between measurement and theory presented a conundrum at the time.

The LHB offers a potential explanation for this anomaly. Under this model, the rocks dating to 3.8 Ga solidified only after much of the crust was destroyed by the LHB. Collectively, the Acasta Gneiss in the North American cratonic shield and the gneisses within the Jack Hills portion of the Narryer Gneiss Terrane in Western Australia are the oldest continental fragments on Earth, yet they appear to post-date the LHB. The oldest mineral yet dated on Earth, a 4.404 Ga zircon from Jack Hills, predates this event, but it is likely a fragment of crust left over from before the LHB, contained within a much younger (~3.8 Ga old) rock.

The Jack Hills zircon led to an evolution in understanding of the Hadean eon. Older references generally show that Hadean Earth had a molten surface with prominent volcanos. The name "Hadean" itself refers to the "hellish" conditions assumed on Earth for the time, from the Greek Hades. Zircon dating suggested, albeit controversially, that the Hadean surface was solid, temperate, and covered by acidic oceans. This picture derives from the presence of particular isotopic ratios that suggest the action of water-based chemistry at some time before the formation of the oldest rocks (see cool early Earth).

Of particular interest, Manfred Schidlowski argued in 1979 that the carbon isotopic ratios of some sedimentary rocks found in Greenland were a relic of organic matter: the ratio of carbon-12 to carbon-13 was unusually high, normally a sign of "processing" by life. There was much debate over the precise dating of the rocks, with Schidlowski suggesting they were about 3.8 Ga old, and others suggesting a more "modest" 3.6 Ga. In either case it was a very short time for abiogenesis to have taken place, and if Schidlowski was correct, arguably too short a time. The Late Heavy Bombardment and the "re-melting" of the crust that it suggests provides a timeline under which this would be possible: life either formed immediately after the Late Heavy Bombardment, or more likely survived it, having arisen earlier during the Hadean. A 2002 study suggest that the rocks Schidlowski found are indeed from the older end of the possible age range at about 3.85 Ga, suggesting the latter possibility is the most likely answer. Studies from 2005, 2006 and 2009 have found no evidence for the isotopically-light carbon ratios that were the basis for the original claims of early Hadean life. However, a similar study of Jack Hills rocks from 2008 shows traces of the same sort of potential organic indicators. Thorsten Geisler of the Institute for Mineralogy at the University of Münster studied traces of carbon trapped in small pieces of diamond and graphite within zircons dating to 4.25 Ga.

Three-dimensional computer models developed in May 2009 by a team at the University of Colorado at Boulder postulate that much of Earth's crust, and the microbes living in it, could have survived the bombardment. Their models suggest that although the surface of Earth would have been sterilized, hydrothermal vents below Earth's surface could have incubated life by providing a sanctuary for thermophile microbes. In April 2014, scientists reported finding evidence of the largest terrestrial meteor impact event to date near the Barberton Greenstone Belt. They estimated the impact occurred about 3.26 billion years ago and that the impactor was approximately 37 to 58 kilometres (23 to 36 miles) wide. The crater from this event, if it still exists, has not yet been found.

== Possible causes ==
=== Giant-planet migration ===
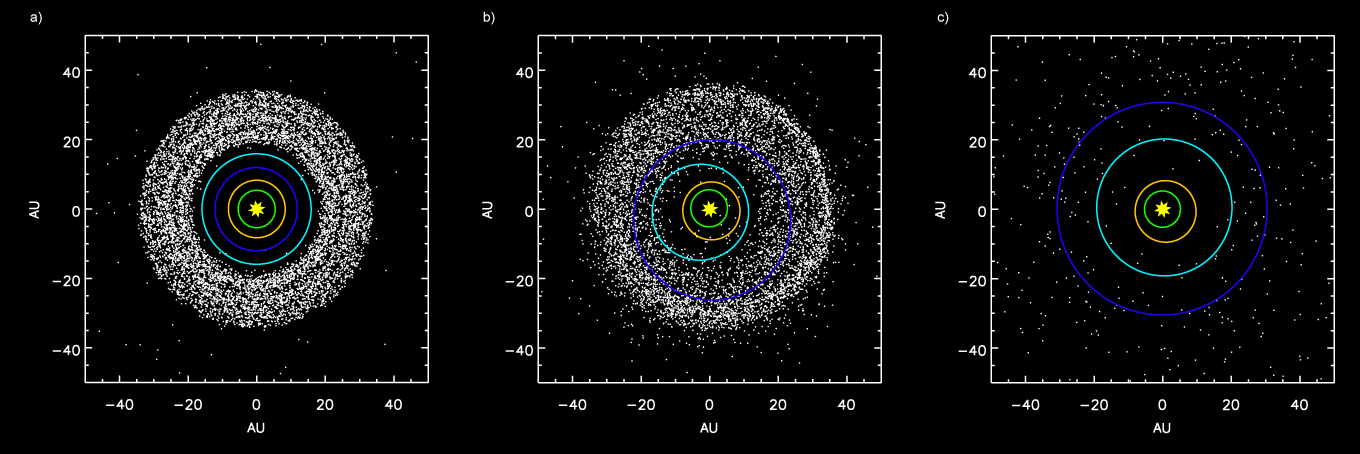
Simulation showing outer planets and planetesimal belt: (a) Early configuration, before Jupiter (green) and Saturn (orange) reach 2:1 resonance; (b) Scattering of planetesimals into the inner Solar System after the orbital shift of Neptune (dark blue) and Uranus (light blue); (c) After ejection of planetesimals by planets.

In the Nice model, the Late Heavy Bombardment is the result of a dynamical instability in the outer Solar System. The original Nice model simulations by Gomes et al. began with the Solar System's giant planets in a tight orbital configuration surrounded by a rich trans-Neptunian belt. Objects from this belt stray into planet-crossing orbits, causing the orbits of the planets to migrate over several hundred million years. Jupiter and Saturn's orbits drift apart slowly until they cross a 2:1 orbital resonance, causing the eccentricities of their orbits to increase. The orbits of the planets become unstable and Uranus and Neptune are scattered onto wider orbits that disrupt the outer belt, causing a bombardment of comets as they enter planet-crossing orbits. Interactions between the objects and the planets also drive a faster migration of Jupiter and Saturn's orbits. This migration causes resonances to sweep through the asteroid belt, increasing the eccentricities of many asteroids until they enter the inner Solar System and impact the terrestrial planets.

The Nice model has undergone some modification since its initial publication. The giant planets now begin in a multi-resonant configuration due to an early gas-driven migration through the protoplanetary disk. Interactions with the trans-Neptunian belt allow their escape from the resonances after several hundred million years. The encounters between planets that follow include one between an ice giant and Saturn that propels the ice giant onto a Jupiter-crossing orbit followed by an encounter with Jupiter that drives the ice giant outward. This jumping-Jupiter scenario quickly increases the separation of Jupiter and Saturn, limiting the effects of resonance sweeping on the asteroids and the terrestrial planets. While this is required to preserve the low eccentricities of the terrestrial planets and avoid leaving the asteroid belt with too many high-eccentricity asteroids, it also reduces the fraction of asteroids removed from the main asteroid belt, leaving a now-nearly-depleted inner band of asteroids as the primary source of the impactors of the LHB. The ice giant is often ejected following its encounter with Jupiter, leading some to propose that the Solar System began with five giant planets. Recent works, however, have found that impacts from this inner asteroid belt would be insufficient to explain the formation of ancient impact spherule beds and the lunar basins, and that the asteroid belt was probably not the source of the Late Heavy Bombardment.

=== Late formation of Uranus and Neptune ===
According to one planetesimal simulation of the establishment of the planetary system, the outermost planets Uranus and Neptune formed very slowly, over a period of several billion years. Harold Levison and his team have also suggested that the relatively low density of material in the outer Solar System during planet formation would have greatly slowed their accretion. The late formation of these planets has therefore been suggested as a different reason for the LHB. However, recent calculations of gas-flows combined with planetesimal runaway growth in the outer Solar System imply that Jovian planets formed extremely rapidly, on the order of 10 My, which does not support this explanation for the LHB.

=== Planet V hypothesis ===
The Planet V hypothesis posits that a fifth terrestrial planet caused the Late Heavy Bombardment when its meta-stable orbit entered the inner asteroid belt. The hypothetical fifth terrestrial planet, Planet V, had a mass less than half of Mars and originally orbited between Mars and the asteroid belt. Planet V's orbit became unstable due to perturbations from the other inner planets causing it to intersect the inner asteroid belt. After close encounters with Planet V, many asteroids entered Earth-crossing orbits, causing the Late Heavy Bombardment. Planet V was ultimately lost, likely plunging into the Sun. In numerical simulations, an uneven distribution of asteroids, with the asteroids heavily concentrated toward the inner asteroid belt, has been shown to be necessary to produce the LHB via this mechanism. An alternate version of this hypothesis in which the lunar impactors are debris resulting from Planet V impacting Mars, forming the Borealis Basin, has been proposed to explain a low number of giant lunar basins relative to craters and a lack of evidence of cometary impactors.

=== Disruption of Mars-crossing asteroid ===
A hypothesis proposed by Matija Ćuk posits that the last few basin-forming impacts were the result of the collisional disruption of a large Mars-crossing asteroid. This Vesta-sized asteroid was a remnant of a population which initially was much larger than the current main asteroid belt. Most of the pre-Imbrium impacts would have been due to these Mars-crossing objects, with the early bombardment extending until 4.1 billion years ago. A period without many basin-forming impacts then followed, during which the lunar magnetic field decayed. Then, roughly 3.9 billion years ago, a catastrophic impact disrupted the Vesta-sized asteroid, significantly increasing the population of Mars-crossing objects. Many of these objects then evolved onto Earth-crossing orbits, producing a spike in the lunar impact rate during which the last few lunar impact basins are formed. Ćuk points to the weak or absent residual magnetism of the last few basins and a change in the size–frequency distribution of craters which formed during this late bombardment as evidence supporting this hypothesis. The timing and the cause of the change in the size–frequency distribution of craters is controversial.

=== Other potential sources ===
A number of other possible sources of the Late Heavy Bombardment have been investigated. Among these are additional Earth satellites orbiting independently or as lunar trojans, planetesimals left over from the formations of the terrestrial planets, Earth or Venus co-orbitals, and the breakup of a large main belt asteroid. Additional Earth satellites on independent orbits were shown to be quickly captured into resonances during the Moon's early tidally-driven orbital expansion and were lost or destroyed within a few million years. Lunar trojans were found to be destabilized within 100 million years by a solar resonance when the Moon reached 27 Earth radii. Planetesimals left over from the formation of the terrestrial planets were shown to be depleted too rapidly due to collisions and ejections to form the last lunar basins. The long-term stability of primordial Earth or Venus co-orbitals (trojans or objects with horseshoe orbits) in conjunction with the lack of current observations indicate that they were unlikely to have been common enough to contribute to the LHB. Producing the LHB from the collisional disruption of a main belt asteroid was found to require at minimum a 1,000–1,500 km parent body with the most favorable initial conditions. Debris produced by collisions among inner planets, now lost, has also been proposed as a source of the LHB.

== Exosystem with possible Late Heavy Bombardment ==
Evidence has been found for Late Heavy Bombardment-like conditions around the star Eta Corvi.

== See also ==
- Cool early Earth – Geologic eon, 4567–4031 million years ago
- Formation and evolution of the Solar System
