= Hadean zircon =

Oldest-surviving crustal material from the Hadean Eon

Hadean zircon is the oldest-surviving crustal material from the Earth's earliest geological time period, the Hadean Eon, about 4 billion years ago. Zircon is a mineral that is commonly used for radiometric dating because it is highly resistant to chemical changes and appears in the form of small crystals or grains in most igneous and metamorphic host rocks.

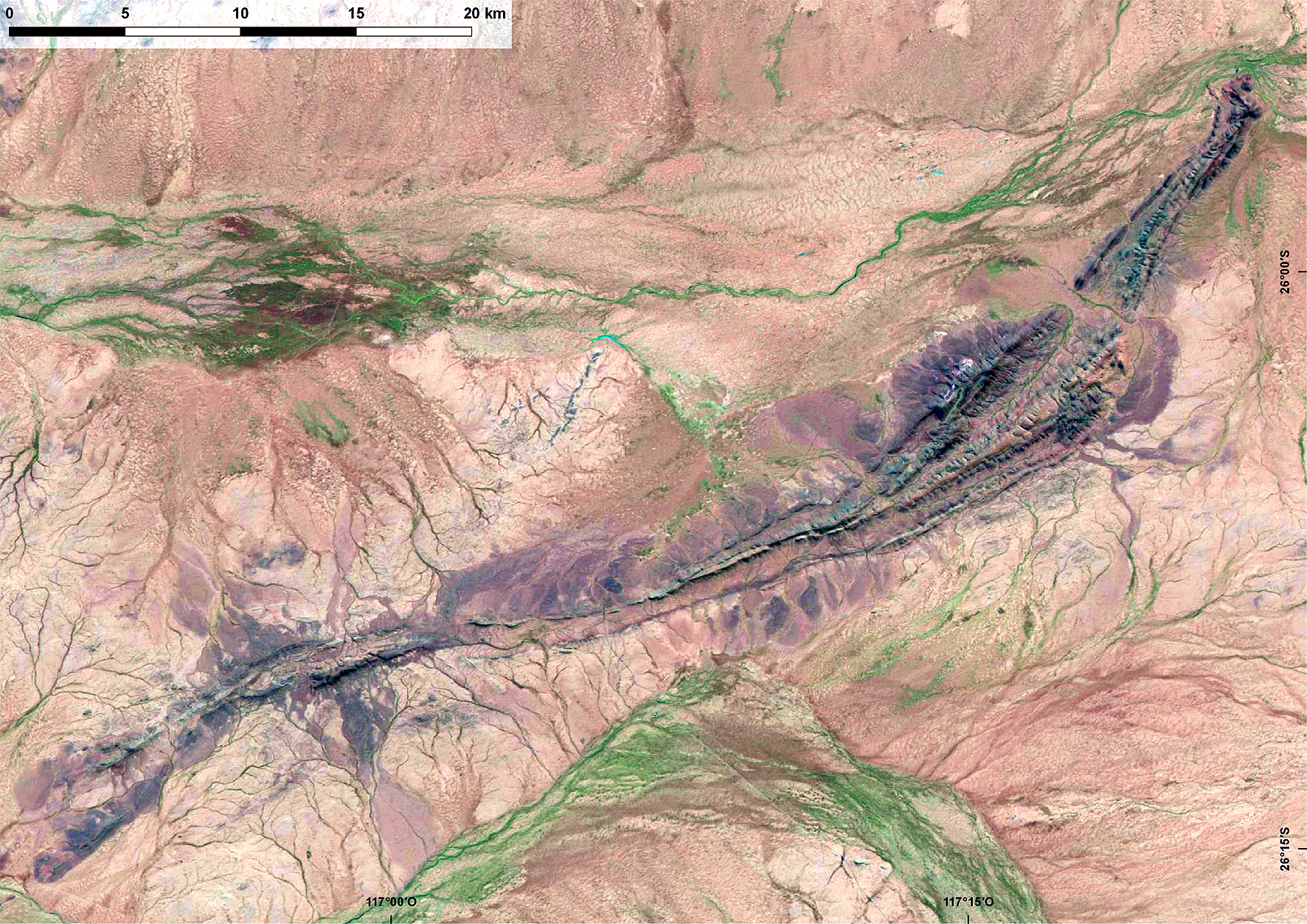
Aerial photo of the Jack Hills, Australia

Hadean zircon has very low abundance around the globe because of recycling of material by plate tectonics. When the rock at the surface is buried deep in the Earth it is heated and can recrystallise or melt. In the Jack Hills, Australia, scientists obtained a relatively comprehensive record of Hadean zircon crystals in contrast to other locations. The Jack Hills zircons are found in metamorphosed sediments that were initially deposited around 3 billion years ago, or during the Archean Eon. However, the zircon crystals there are older than the rocks that contain them. Many investigations have been carried out to find the absolute age and properties of zircon, for example the isotope ratios, mineral inclusions, and geochemistry of zircon. The characteristics of Hadean zircons show early Earth history and the mechanism of Earth's processes in the past. Based on the properties of these zircon crystals, many different geological models were proposed.

== Background ==
=== Importance ===
==== Deeper understanding of Earth history ====
The geological history of the Hadean Eon of early earth is poorly known due to the lack of rock record older than 4.02 Ga (giga-annum or billion years). Most scientists accept that the plate recycling mechanism has melted almost all pieces of Earth's crust. However, some tiny parts of the crust have not been melted, as some rare Hadean zircon grains included in much younger host rock were discovered. The examination of Hadean detrital or inherited grains of zircon can give evidence of geophysical conditions of the early earth.

==== Scientific contribution ====
Since there is no strong evidence depicting the early Earth's true environment, many models are generated to explain early Earth history. The high value of Hadean heat production and impact flux proved that continental crust did not exist, which is very different from the modern process. In the absence of large amount of undistributed data and within the constraints of analytical methods, calculation on geophysics and planetary science has been rapidly developed to explore this new area of knowledge.

=== Abundance ===
Less than 1% of zircons detected around the world are over four billion years old. The probability of discovering so much as a single zircon over four billion years in age is very low. The abundance of over four billion-year-old zircon in the Jack Hills is anomalously high for most Archean quartzites and thus abundances probabilities of other spots are extremely low (0.2–0.02%).

By adopting uranium–lead dating (U–Pb) together with other analytical methods, more geochemical information can be obtained. Only 3% out of over 200,000 detrital zircon grains dated by U–Pb analysis are over four billion years old.

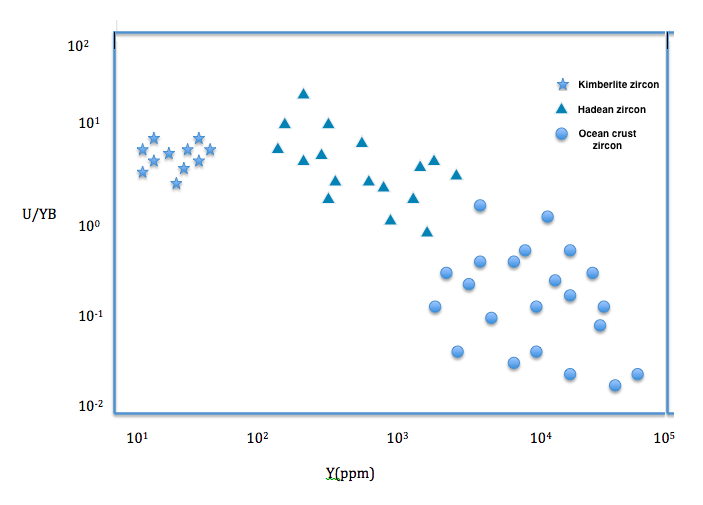
A uranium to ytterbium concentration ratio versus yttrium concentration plot (U/Yb vs Y) shows different trace elements signatures of zircon sources. Stars are the data for Kimberlite zircon, triangles are Hadean Jack Hills zircon and circles are ocean crust zircon.

=== Types ===
Due to different content of uranium and trace element concentration, four clusters of zircons are identified as below

- Lunar and meteorite zircon
- Detrital grains zircon
- Kimberlite zircon
- Ocean crust zircon

Low crystallisation temperatures and trace element characteristics are the two major characteristics that differentiate mantle derived zircon or oceanic crust-derived zircon. Lunar and meteoritic zircons are unique because of their REE signature for example, lack of a cerium anomaly. The crystallization temperature ranges from 900 to 1100 °C. In contrast, terrestrial Hadean zircons are restricted to 600 to 780 °C. Hadean Jack Hills zircon has a wide range of oxygen fraction comparing to meteoritic zircons. No extraterrestrial zircons were found in any terrestrial locality. The textural characteristics like the growth zoning and inclusion mineralogy shows that Hadean zircon from the Jack Hills all come from igneous sources.

== Properties ==
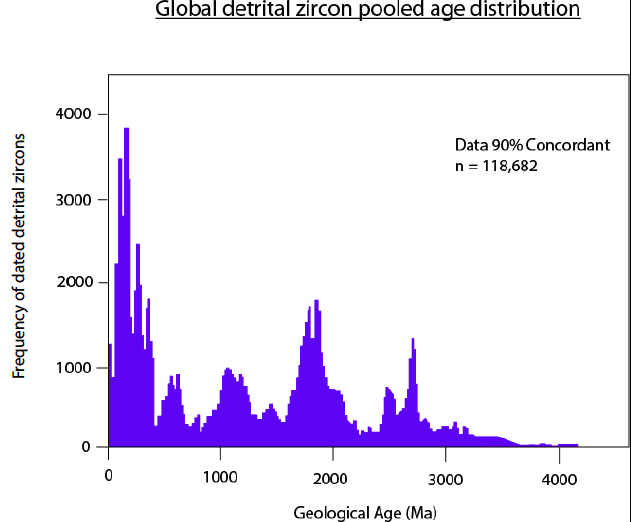
Histograms for concordant Jack Hills zircons. This is a histogram of rapid initial survey of individual ^{207}Pb/^{206}Pb ages undertaken to identify the >4.2Ga population. There are 3 dominant peaks and 2 minor peaks.

The unspecified samples used for analyses below were Jack Hills zircon in Australia because of the high abundances and data available.

=== Age distribution ===
U–Pb dating in the U–Pb zircon system has long been viewed as the crustal geochronometer because zircon is chemically resistant and enriched in U and Th compared to the daughter product Pb. Trace element and isotopic composition of zircon is important to determine the crystallisation environment.

Results from detrital zircons from the Erawondoo Hill discovery site conglomerate generally show the zircons to have a bimodal age distribution with major peaks at c. 3.4 and 4.1 Ga.

However, zircon is sensitive to radiation damage and can degrade into amorphous material. The Hadean zircon with original uranium concentrations greater than 600 ppm is challenged by the effect of post-crystallization alteration.

=== Isotope geochemistry ===
Stable isotope data, indicating that the original host rocks to the zircon related to a significant amount of material formed on or near the Earth's surface and subsequently transferred to a middle- to lower-crustal level where they melted to generate the host magmas from which zircon crystallised.

Data type	Observation	Interpretation	Limitation
Oxygen isotope ratios	Granitoids with δ^{18}O values less than mantle values	There were hydrothermal interactions with meteoric water instead of weathering.	There is a lack of comprehensive record of the analysed areas within the grains, which leads to difficulty in relating ages of specifically dated parts of the zircon grains to their oxygen and hafnium isotope systematics and trace element concentrations.
Oxygen isotope ratios	Ratios of oxygen isotopes have been measured in Hadean zircons. High values of δ^{18}O observed in Hadean Jack Hills zircons led to two different ideas about the source of Hadean zircon.	Water was present on the Earth's surface around 4.3 Ga.	There is a lack of comprehensive record of the analysed areas within the grains, which leads to difficulty in relating ages of specifically dated parts of the zircon grains to their oxygen and hafnium isotope systematics and trace element concentrations.
Oxygen isotope ratios	Hadean Jack Hills zircons contain more ^{18}O-enrichments than the mantle zircon about 5.3%. I-type granitoids protoliths give relatively low δ^{18}O values while those derived by S type metasedimentary rocks have higher δ^{18}O values.	The presence in the protolith of recycled crustal material that had interacted with liquid water under surface, or near surface, condition.	There is a lack of comprehensive record of the analysed areas within the grains, which leads to difficulty in relating ages of specifically dated parts of the zircon grains to their oxygen and hafnium isotope systematics and trace element concentrations.
Lutetium-hafnium	The ratio of isotopes of hafnium ^{176}Hf/^{177}Hf data in crustal rocks being consistent with the formation of crust since 4.5 Ga.	Lu-Hf systematics potentially indicating existence of an early formed reservoir, similar to continental crust in its degree of Lu depletion relative to Hf.	Most of the data matches the formation of crust at 4.5 Ga while some zircon data is unreasonable requiring the removal of protolith from chrondritic uniform reservoir (CHUR). Since these extra findings, studies cannot conform the positive value of E_{Hf(T)} due to the complication of Hf isotope analysis and lack of U–Pb date being simultaneously available.
Lutetium-hafnium	Cluster of results along a line corresponding to a Lu/Hf ~0.01, low reservoir at ~4Ga	The data is consistent with either early extraction of very felsic crust or by remelting of a primordial basaltic reservoir, but in either case extrapolation of this trend yields a present-day εHf(T) of approximately −100	A recycling event c. 3.9–3.7 Ga which resembles the Hf isotope evolution of modern subduction-related orogens and so may have additional tectonic significance.
Plutonium-xenon	Some Hadean zircon grains originally contained plutonium, an element that has since disappeared from the natural environment. In the meteorite record, the abundance ratio of initial plutonium to uranium (Pu/U) was about 0.007 and ^{244}Pu was present in the early Solar System.	The result of the ratio can be interpreted as xenon loss during later metamorphism. Uranium became oxidised to soluble uranyl ion (UO_{2}^{2+}) while the solubility of plutonium compounds is low, variations in Pu/U are regarded as an effective indicator of aqueous alteration in Jack Hills protoliths.	Only Nd/U has correlations expected from aqueous processes excluding analysis of Xe isotopic ratios, U–Pb age, trace element contents, and δ^{18}O
Plutonium-xenon	The initial Pu/U ratios of Jack Hills zircon ranges from c. 0.007 to zero.	Due to Xe loss during later metamorphism. Variation in Pu/U has been suggested as a potential indicator of aqueous alteration in the Jack Hills zircon protoliths	Only Nd/U has correlations expected from aqueous processes excluding analysis of Xe isotopic ratios, U–Pb age, trace element contents, and δ^{18}O
Plutonium-xenon	High-Nd/U zircons display only low Pu/U, while Nd/U zircons show more heterogeneous Pu/U	High-Nd/U group appears less magmatically evolved than other Hadean zircons, has REE patterns suggestive of some degree of alteration, either by hydrothermal fluid interaction or phosphate replacement, and consists of solely low-Pu/U zircons with a range of Hadean to Proterozoic U-Xe ages	Only Nd/U has correlations expected from aqueous processes excluding analysis of Xe isotopic ratios, U–Pb age, trace element contents, and δ^{18}O
Lithium	Lithium isotopes significantly vary in Hadean zircon. The ^{7}Li isotope result of Hadean Jack Hills zircons gave highly negative values.	The environment of forming zircon as highly weathered.	A high lithium diffusion rate in zircon at low temperature and exchange with hydrogen during metamorphism are two examples of subsequent variations to lithium that may limit the usefulness of the measurements
Lithium	Li is homogeneously distributed within single growth zones of the zircons. Jack Hills zircons are zoned in both ^{7}Li and Li concentration.	These values correlate with igneous growth zoning.	A high lithium diffusion rate in zircon at low temperature and exchange with hydrogen during metamorphism are two examples of subsequent variations to lithium that may limit the usefulness of the measurements

=== Mineral inclusions ===
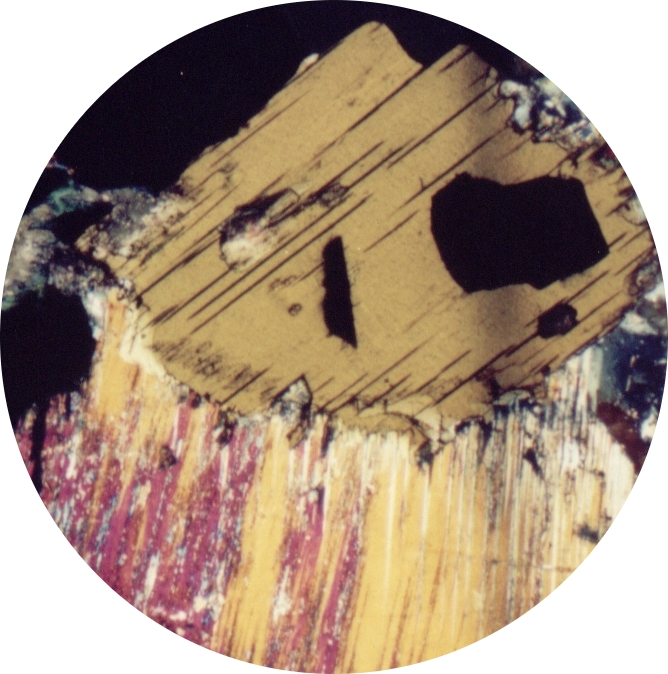
Greenish brown biotite with opaque magnetite inclusions and yellow-violet muscovite (cross polarized microscopic view)

The development of textural criteria for identifying primary inclusions opens up possibilities for recognising zircons' changing provenance with time and investigating their post-depositional alteration history. There are two common inclusion assemblages that are consistent with their forming in "I-type" (hornblende, quartz, biotite, plagioclase, apatite, ilmenite) and "S-type" (quartz, K-feldspar, muscovite, monazite) granitoids. Dominated by quartz with less abundant K-feldspar, plagioclase, muscovite, biotite, and phosphates, that are interpreted to have formed under relatively low geothermal gradient similar to that pertaining to modern subduction zones.

Data type	Observation	Interpretation
Muscovite	Quartz and muscovite are the principal inclusion phases, potentially pointing to an aluminous granitic source. Hopkins (2010) used a thermodynamic solution model for celadonite substitution in muscovite to estimate pressures for muscovite inclusions in magmatic zircons. The result revealed that the pressure conditions for over 1700 inclusion samples is greater than 5 kbar, coupled with a relatively low host zircons crystallization temperature.	Muscovite inclusion coupled with a thermodynamic model implied that the Earth surface had a remarkably low heat flow. This result led scientists to suggest formation in an underthrust or subduction-like environment as found on the modern Earth
Iron oxides	Cerium anomaly of a zircon (Ce/Ce*) is a quantitative investigation for host magma fO_{2}. Hadean Jack Hills zircons show a range in fO_{2} with an average near the fayalite-magnetite-quartz (FMQ) buffer.	The Hadean geological setting is similar to the modern upper mantle
Biotite	Composition of biotite differ among granitoids. FeO, MgO and Al_{2}O_{3} content isolate calc-alkaline, peraluminous and alkaline granitoids.	The nature of Hadean melt compositions can be known.
Biotite	Sulfide and carbonaceous phases have been revealed in Hadean zircon though the number of cases is small.	The rare phases have deleted the volatile contents in Hadean magmas and source materials.
Graphite	By knowing the occurrence of carbon, existence of life can be revealed in the aspect of timing, conditions and mechanisms.	Isotopic result identified the zircon was 3.8 to 3.5 billion years age and metabolism has occurred within the host microbiota.

=== Zircon geochemistry ===
By analysing the content of zircon, some zircon show the presence of titanium, rare earth minerals, lithium, aluminium and carbon. Certain ratio and normal distribution give evidence of zircon's origin and the source of magma.

Data type	Observation	Interpretation	Limitation
Titanium	The content of Ti-in-zircon serves as a crystallization thermometer given knowledge of the melt a_{SiO2} and a_{TiO2.} The Ti measurements were applied to grains ranging from 3.91 to 4.35 Ga and the majority of the data plots a normal distribution graph.	Crystallisation of Ti-in-zircon grains are from evolved melts	It yielded an extremely high temperature 680±25 °C. Since the crystallisation of rutile is unknown, researchers can only estimate the temperature by calculation.
Rare-earth mineral	Cerium anomaly of a zircon (Ce/Ce*) is a quantitative investigation for host magma f_{O2}. The result showed low value of Ce/Ce* ratio.	Diversity of source materials	REE signatures in some zircon grains that have been interpreted to indicate crystallisation of these grains from evolved melts.
Rare-earth mineral	In EDS analysis, magnetite was dominant in the inclusion instead of ilmenite in granitoids.	Hydrothermal alternation of zircon is often determined by high, flat light rare-earth mineral (LREE) pattern.	REE signatures in some zircon grains that have been interpreted to indicate crystallisation of these grains from evolved melts.
Lithium	Li zoning in zircon serve as a peak temperature indicator while examining retention of primary remanent magnetic signals. Jack Hills zircon containing c. 5up-wide Li concentration band which required below 500 °C peak heating temperature of zircon.	The grains can be applied to study primary magnetism because it did not exceed the Curie temperature which is 585 °C for magnetite.	The metaconglomerates at Erawondoo Hill did not experience temperature greater than 500 °C. The result showed that there is variation of data and thermal history in different occurrences.
Aluminium	Peraluminous granitoids contain around 10 ppm aluminium in Jack Hills zircon while the I-type and A-type zircon obtained average 1.3 ppm. The molar value of Al_{2}O_{3}/(CaO+Na_{2}O+K_{2}O) greater than 1.	The origin is from recycled pelitic material.	Small amount of sample zircon contains high Al contents suggests that metaluminous crustal rocks is more common than peraluminous rocks in the Hadean. However, the c. 20% overlap of low Al (i.e., < 5 ppm) in S-type zircons somewhat obscures this inference.
Aluminium	Some of the grains show high aluminium content	Metaluminous crustal rocks may be more common than peraluminous rocks in the Hadean.	Small amount of sample zircon contains high Al contents suggests that metaluminous crustal rocks is more common than peraluminous rocks in the Hadean. However, the c. 20% overlap of low Al (i.e., < 5 ppm) in S-type zircons somewhat obscures this inference.
Carbon	Scientists measured concentration of carbon in the form of graphite in zircon by using secondary ion mass spectrometer (SIMS). Detecting Hadean crustal carbon could ensure that there was a transfer of carbon from mantle reservoirs	Allow the selection among models of the early earth.	Quite a few early earth models contain this property which cannot confirm which model is correct

== Analytic method ==
Ion microprobe analysis

=== Ion microprobe analysis ===
Ion microprobe (or secondary ion mass spectrometry, SIMS) and uranium–thorium–lead geochronology are two common methods to measure isotope in specific time interval.

Highly precise in situ SIMS measurements of oxygen isotopes and OH/O ratios, laser-ablation inductively-coupled mass spectrometry (LA-ICP-MS) determination of hafnium isotopes, and atom-probe tomography. LA-ICP-MS is the most common method to date using isotopes but it lacks capacity to measure ^{204}Pb. Therefore, there is a possibility that the occurrences of single zircons over 4 billion years old could be due to inclusion of non-radiogenic Pb.

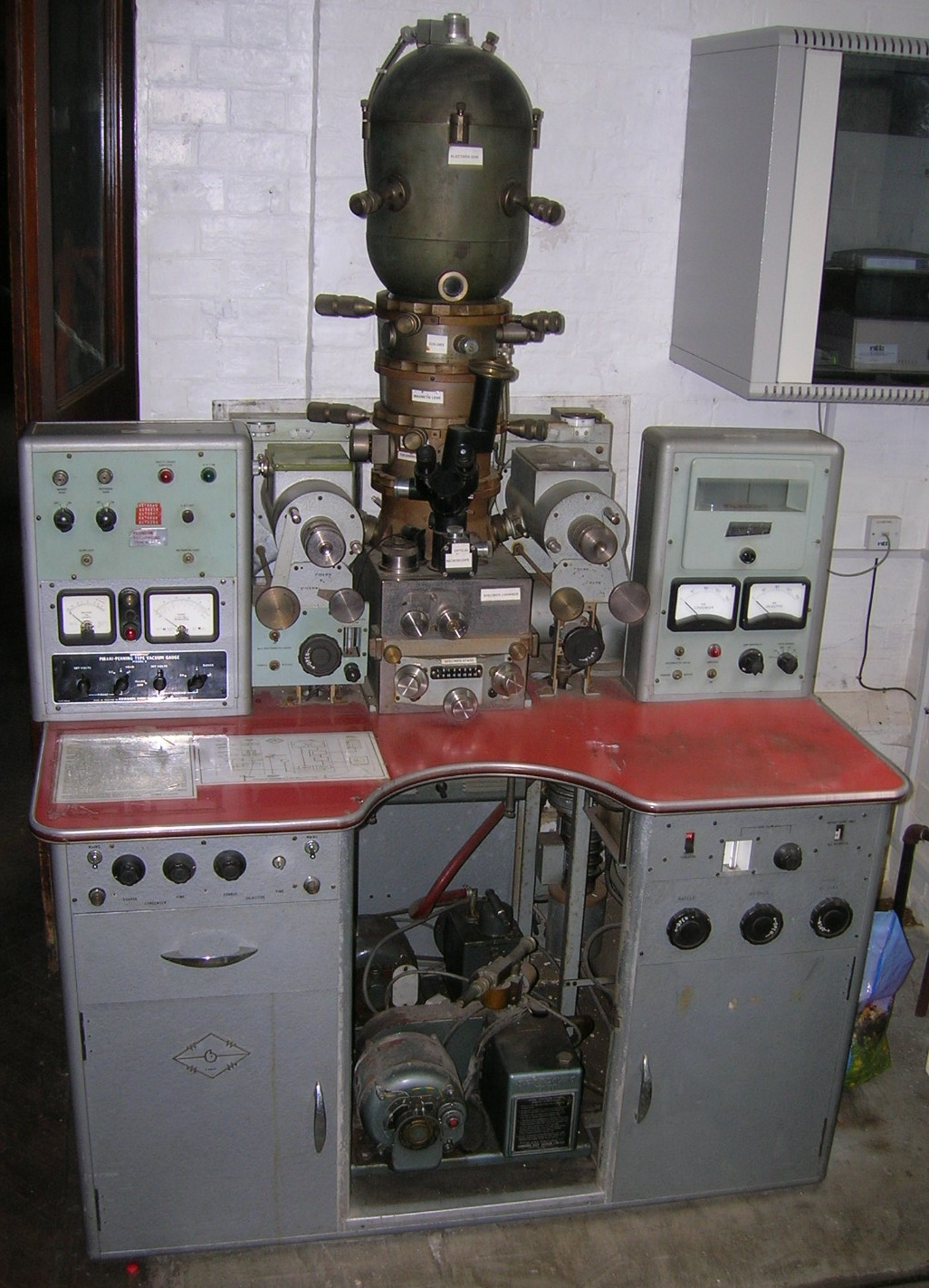
Electron probe microanalyser

U–Pb dating, delta ^{18}O and Ti measurements can be tested by CAMECA ims 1270 ion microprobe. Epoxy are applied on the sample. A flat surface of sample is needed to conduct an analysis. U–Pb dating and T measurement uses a primary O^{−} beam with low intensity (10–15 nA). U–Pb age standard AS3 was used for dating studies. The concentration of Ti can be determined based on analysis of Jack Hills zircon and NIST610 glass.

=== Electron microprobe analysis ===
For inclusions investigation, JEOL 8600 electron microprobe analyzer (EPMA) were used to chemically analyze zircon. It is used to analyze the chemical composition of material. Electron beams are emitted to the mineral's surface and blow off ions and estimate the abundance of the elements within a very small sized sample. Many isotopes can be measured at once in this analysis for example Ti and Li.

== Occurrence ==
The red dots represent the location of Hadean zircon on the world map

Occurrences	Analytic method and result	Interpretation
=== Australia ===
Mt. Narryer	Ion microprobe dating of 80 detrital zircons from quartzites have disclosed that 2% to 12% grains >4.0Ga, with younger zircons ranging to ca.3 Ga. In the LA-ICP-MS study, Mt. Narryer zircons has higher U contents and lowest Ce/Ce* in contrast to Jack Hills zircons	Diversity of source rock. Magmatic origins.
Churla Wells	The grains are 4.14 to 4.18Ga by using 207Pb/206Pb dating. Core region has a much lower Hf, REE, Uand Th than other outer region. While U content in core is around 666ppm, Th/U is 0.6.	Granitic magma origin
Maynard Hills	Dating of greenstone belt revealed that the 207Pb/206Pb age is 4.35Ga.	/
Mt Alfred	The concordant zircon has the age 4.17Ga. No geochemistry data has been collected	/
=== North America ===
Northwest Territory, Canada	The protolith crystallisation age is 3.96Ga analysed by U–Pb dating. Applying LA-ICP-MS, 4.20+0.06Ga zircon was being dated. The unaltered zircon under the above method obtained LREE pattern.	Magmatic origin. Derivation from a felsic melt by a process other than differentiation of a mafic magma
Greenland	The crystallisation age is determined as 3.83±0.01Ga by ion microprobe dating. 4.08±0.02Ga was identified in U–Pb survey	/
=== Asia ===
Tibet	In ion microprobe method, detrital grain's Th/U ratios is greater than 0.7	Magmatic origin
North Qinling	The LA-ICP-MS age of xenocrystic zircon in North Qinling Orogenic Belt is 4.08Ga. Hf isotope also support the age data of LA-ICP-MS test	/
North China Craton	The zircon is 4.17±0.05Ga determined by LA-ICP-MS U–Pb dating method. Th/U ratio is 0.46	Magmatic origin
South China	Conducting ion microprobe U–Pb dating, ^{207}Pb/^{206}Pb age is 4.13±0.01 Ga with 5.9±0.1% _{18}O isotope data. Positive Ce anomaly	early earth is a highly oxidizing environment and a high Ti-in-zircons crystallization temperature of 910'C.
=== South America ===
Southern Guyana	4.22Ga by LA-ICP-MS U–Pb dating method. No other geochemical analysis has been conducted	/
Eastern Brazil	The age of the rock is 4.22Ga and Th/U ratios of 0.8 and high U contents (up to 1400ppm)	Felsic magmatic origin

== Proposed mechanisms for forming Hadean Jack Hills zircons ==
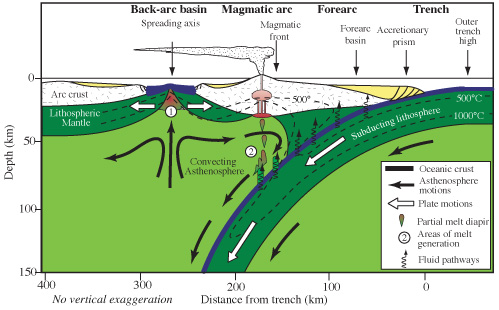
Modern plate tectonic theory

Plate tectonic theory is widely accepted for the generation of crust. Given the Hadean rock record, most scientists conclude that the hypothesis of an early Earth devoid of ocean is incorrect. Scientists have constructed different models to explain the thermal history in the early earth, such as the Tectonic Model, Icelandic rhyolites, intermediate igneous rocks, mafic igneous rocks, sagduction, impact melt, heat-pipe tectonics, terrestrial KREEP and multi-stage scenarios.

It's known that Hadean zircons yield relatively low crystallisation temperature and some are enriched in heavy oxygen, contain inclusion similar to modern crustal processes and show evidence of silicate differentiation at ~4.5 Ga. These observations have been interpreted to reflect an early terrestrial hydrosphere, early felsic crust in which granitoids were produced and later weathered under high water activity conditions and even the possible existence of plate boundary interactions.
