= Oldest dated rocks =

Includes rocks over 4 billion years old from the Hadean Eon

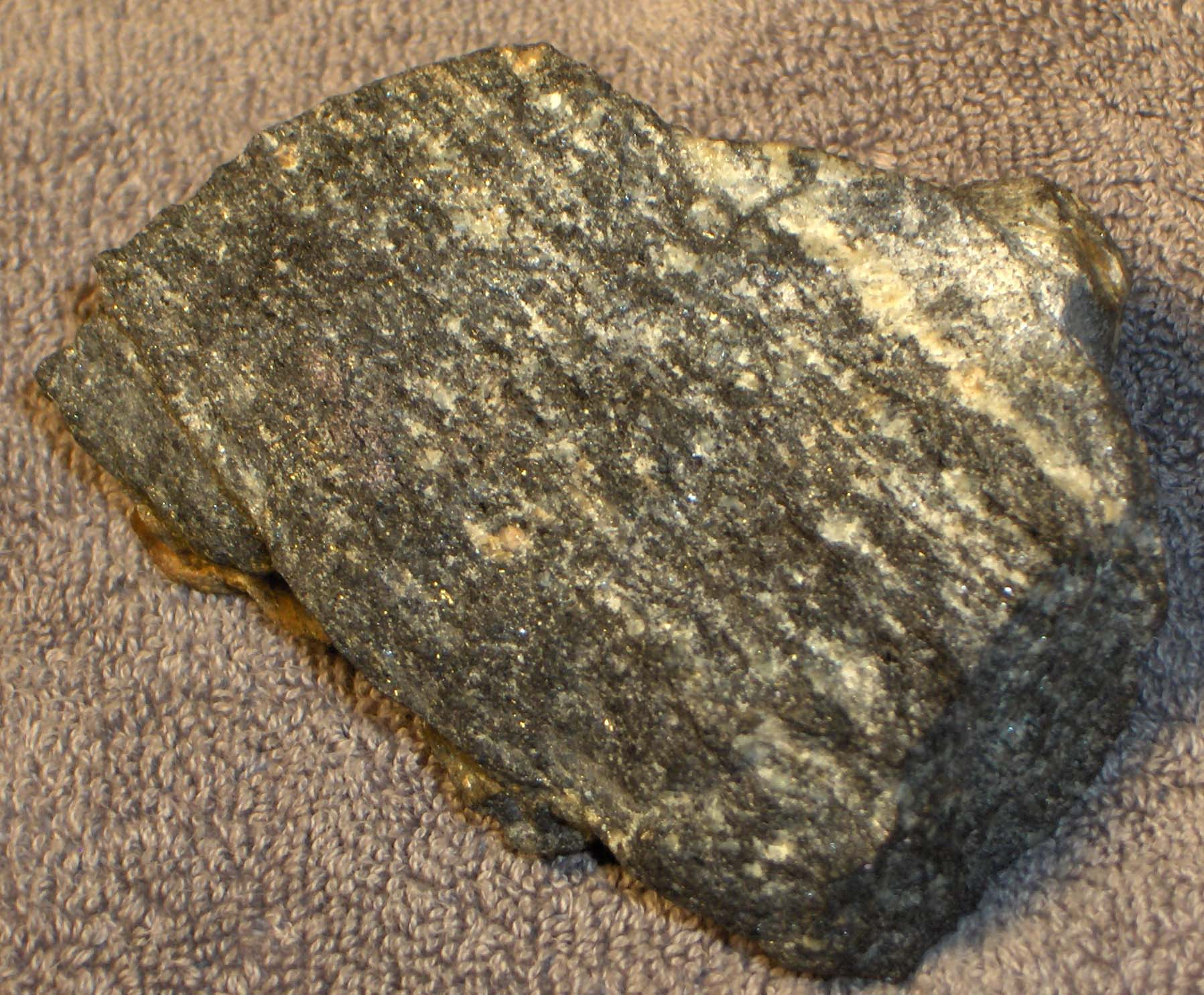
A sample of gneiss from the site of the Earth's oldest dated rocks (the Acasta River area of Canada). This sample has been dated at 4.03 billion years old.

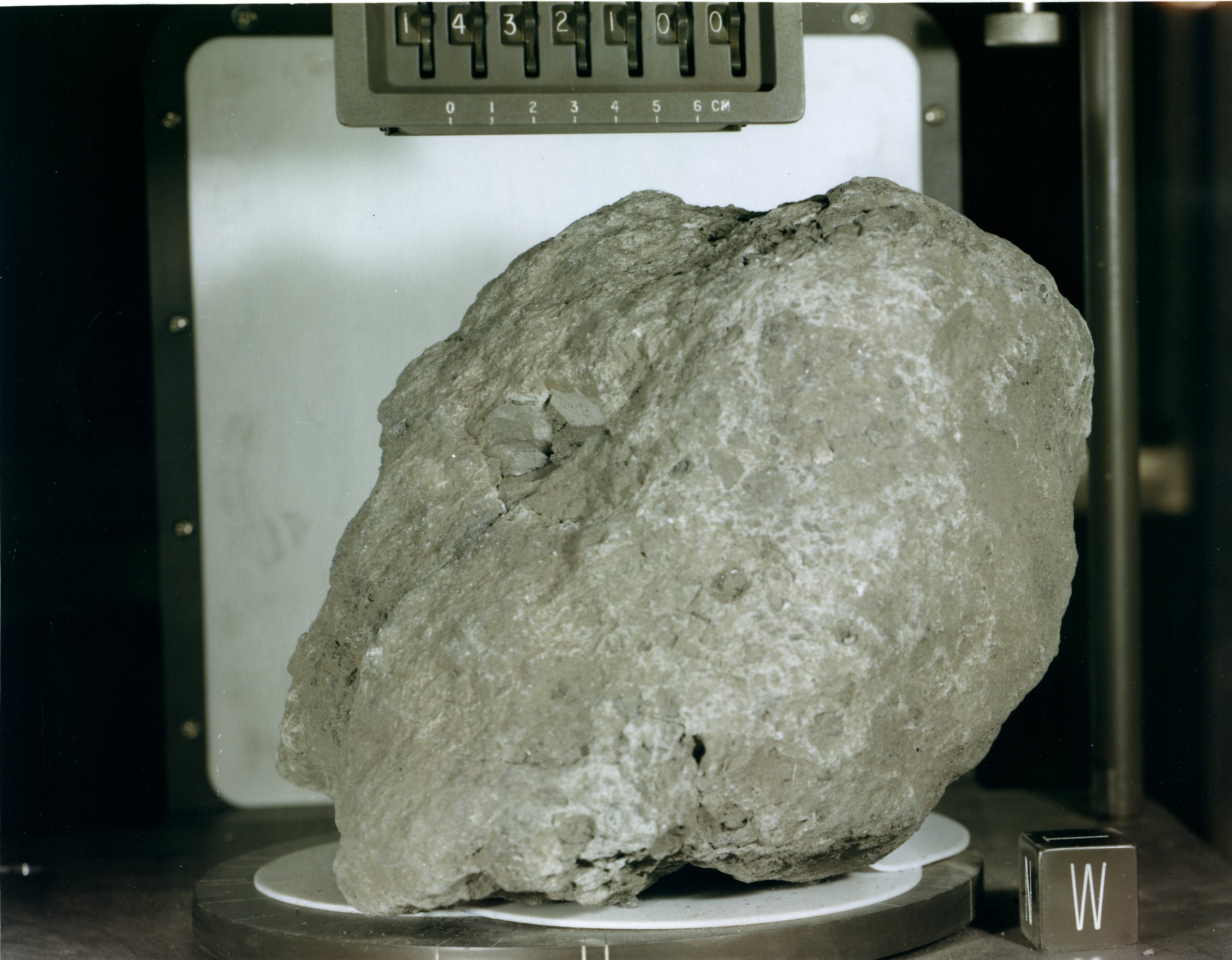
The Moon rock "Big Bertha", collected on the 1971 Apollo 14 mission, may contain an Earth meteorite that is 4 billion years old.

The oldest dated rocks formed on Earth, as an aggregate of minerals that have not been subsequently broken down by erosion or melted, are more than 4 billion years old, formed during the Hadean Eon of Earth's geological history, and mark the start of the Archean Eon, which is defined to start with the formation of the oldest intact rocks on Earth.

Archean rocks are exposed on Earth's surface in very few places, such as in the geologic shields of Canada, Australia, and Africa. The ages of these felsic rocks are generally between 2.5 and 3.8 billion years. The approximate ages have a margin of error of millions of years. In 1999, the oldest known rock on Earth was dated to 4.031 ±0.003 billion years, and is part of the Acasta Gneiss of the Slave Craton in northwestern Canada. Researchers at McGill University found a rock with a very old model age for extraction from the mantle (3.8 to 4.28 billion years ago) in the Nuvvuagittuq greenstone belt on the coast of Hudson Bay, in northern Quebec; the true age of these samples is still under debate, and they may actually be closer to 3.8 billion years old. Older than these rocks are crystals of the mineral zircon, which can survive the disaggregation of their parent rock and be found and dated in younger rock formations.

In January 2019, NASA scientists reported the discovery of the oldest known Earth rock, found on the Moon. Apollo 14 astronauts returned several rocks from the Moon and, later, scientists determined that a fragment from a rock nicknamed Big Bertha, which had been chosen by astronaut Alan Shepard, contained "a bit of Earth from about 4 billion years ago". The rock fragment contained quartz, feldspar, and zircon, all common on Earth, but highly uncommon on the Moon. Pre-solar grains in meteorites are older than the Solar System, with some grains extracted from the Murchison meteorite claimed to be 7 billion years old.

== Oldest rocks by category ==
Life timeline
← / Earth formed; ← / Earliest water; ← / LUCA; ← / Earliest fossils; ← / Great Oxygenation Event; ← / Sexual reproduction; ← / Earliest fungi; ← / Neoproterozoic oxygenation event; ← / Ediacaran biota; ← / Cambrian explosion; ← / Earliest tetrapods; ← / Earliest hominoid
(million years ago)

=== Oldest terrestrial material ===
The oldest material of terrestrial origin that has been dated is a zircon mineral of 4.404 ±0.008 Ga enclosed in a metamorphosed sandstone conglomerate in the Jack Hills of the Narryer Gneiss terrane of Western Australia. The 4.404 ±0.008 Ga zircon is a slight outlier, with the oldest consistently dated zircon falling closer to 4.35 Ga. This zircon is part of a population of zircons within the metamorphosed conglomerate, which is believed to have been deposited about 3.060 Ga, which is the age of the youngest detrital zircon in the rock. Recent developments in atom-probe tomography have led to a further constraint on the age of the oldest continental zircon, with the most recent age quoted as 4.374 ±0.006 Ga.

The discovery of the oldest known Earth rock, found on the Moon, was reported in January 2019 by NASA scientists. Apollo 14 astronauts returned several rocks from the Moon and, later, scientists determined that a fragment from one of the rocks, nicknamed Big Bertha, contained "a bit of Earth from about 4 billion years ago". The rock fragment contained quartz, feldspar, and zircon, all common on Earth, but highly uncommon on the Moon.

=== Earth's oldest rock formation ===
The oldest outcropping rock formation is, depending on the latest research, either part of the Isua Greenstone Belt, Narryer Gneiss terrane, Nuvvuagittuq Greenstone Belt, Napier Complex, or the Acasta Gneiss (on the Slave Craton). The difficulty in assigning the title to one particular block of gneiss is that the gneisses are all extremely deformed, and the oldest rock may be represented by only one streak of minerals in a mylonite, representing a layer of sediment or an old dike. This may be difficult to find or map; hence, the oldest dates yet resolved are as much generated by luck in sampling as by understanding the rocks themselves.

It is thus premature to claim that any of these rocks, or indeed that of other formations of Hadean gneisses, is the oldest formations or rocks on Earth; doubtless, new analyses will continue to change conceptions of the structure and nature of these ancient continental fragments.

Nevertheless, the oldest cratons on Earth include the Kaapvaal craton, the Western Gneiss terrane of the Yilgarn craton (~2.9 – >3.2 Ga), the Pilbara Craton (~3.4 Ga), and portions of the Canadian Shield (~2.4 – >3.6 Ga). Parts of Dharwar Craton in India are greater than 3.0 Ga. The oldest dated rocks of the Baltic Shield are 3.5 Ga old.

Other old formations include the Uviak Gneiss Complex, dated at 3.9 Ga; the Anshan Area, dated at 3.8 Ga; the Itsaq (Isua) Gneiss Complex, dated at 3.7-3.8 Ga; and the Ancient Gneiss Complex, dated at 3.6 Ga.

=== Oldest rock on Earth ===
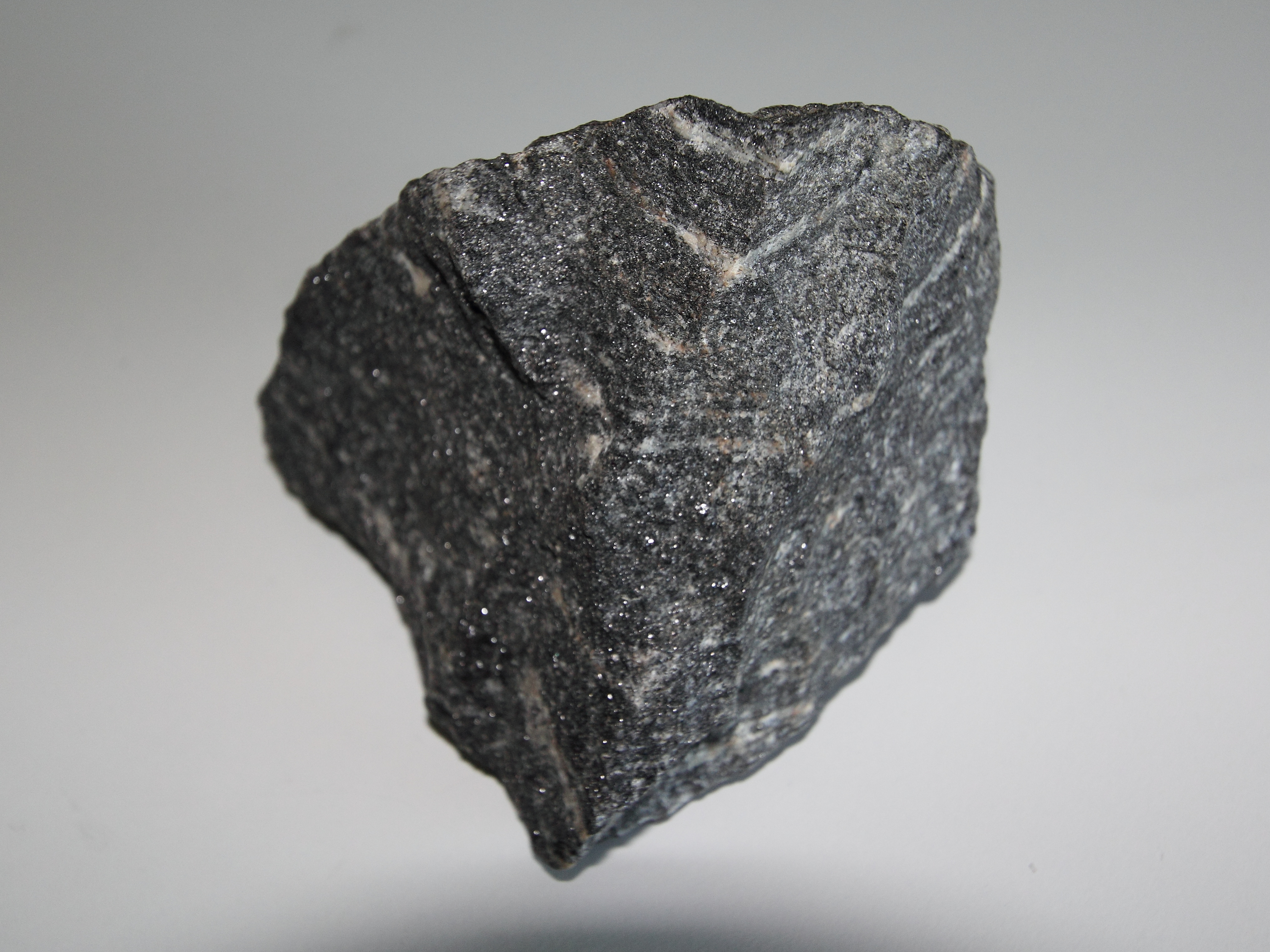
Fragment of Acasta Gneiss

The Acasta Gneiss in the Canadian Shield in the Northwest Territories, Canada is composed of the Archaean igneous and gneissic cores of ancient mountain chains that have been exposed in a glacial peneplain. Analyses of zircons from a felsic orthogneiss with presumed granitic protolith returned an age of 4.031 ±0.003 Ga.

On September 25, 2008, researchers from McGill University, Carnegie Institution for Science and UQAM announced that a rock formation, the Nuvvuagittuq greenstone belt, exposed on the eastern shore of Hudson Bay in northern Quebec had a Sm–Nd model age for extraction from the mantle of 4.28 billion years. However, it is argued that the actual age of formation of this rock, as opposed to the extraction of its magma from the mantle, is likely closer to 3.8 billion years, according to Simon Wilde of the Institute for Geoscience Research in Australia.

=== Hadean Zircons from the Jack Hills of Western Australia ===
The zircons from the Western Australian Jack Hills returned an age of 4.404 billion years, interpreted to be the age of crystallization. These zircons also show another feature; their oxygen isotopic composition has been interpreted to indicate that more than 4.4 billion years ago there was already water on the surface of Earth. The importance and accuracy of these interpretations is currently the subject of scientific debate. It may be that the oxygen isotopes and other compositional features (the rare-earth elements) record more recent hydrothermal alteration of the zircons rather than the composition of the magma at the time of their original crystallization. In a paper published in the journal Earth and Planetary Science Letters, a team of scientists suggest that rocky continents and liquid water existed at least 4.3 billion years ago and were subjected to heavy weathering by an acrid climate. Using an ion microprobe to analyze isotope ratios of the element lithium in zircons from the Jack Hills in Western Australia, and comparing these chemical fingerprints to lithium compositions in zircons from continental crust and primitive rocks similar to Earth's mantle, they found evidence that the young planet already had the beginnings of continents, relatively cool temperatures and liquid water by the time the Australian zircons formed.

=== Non-terrestrial rocks ===
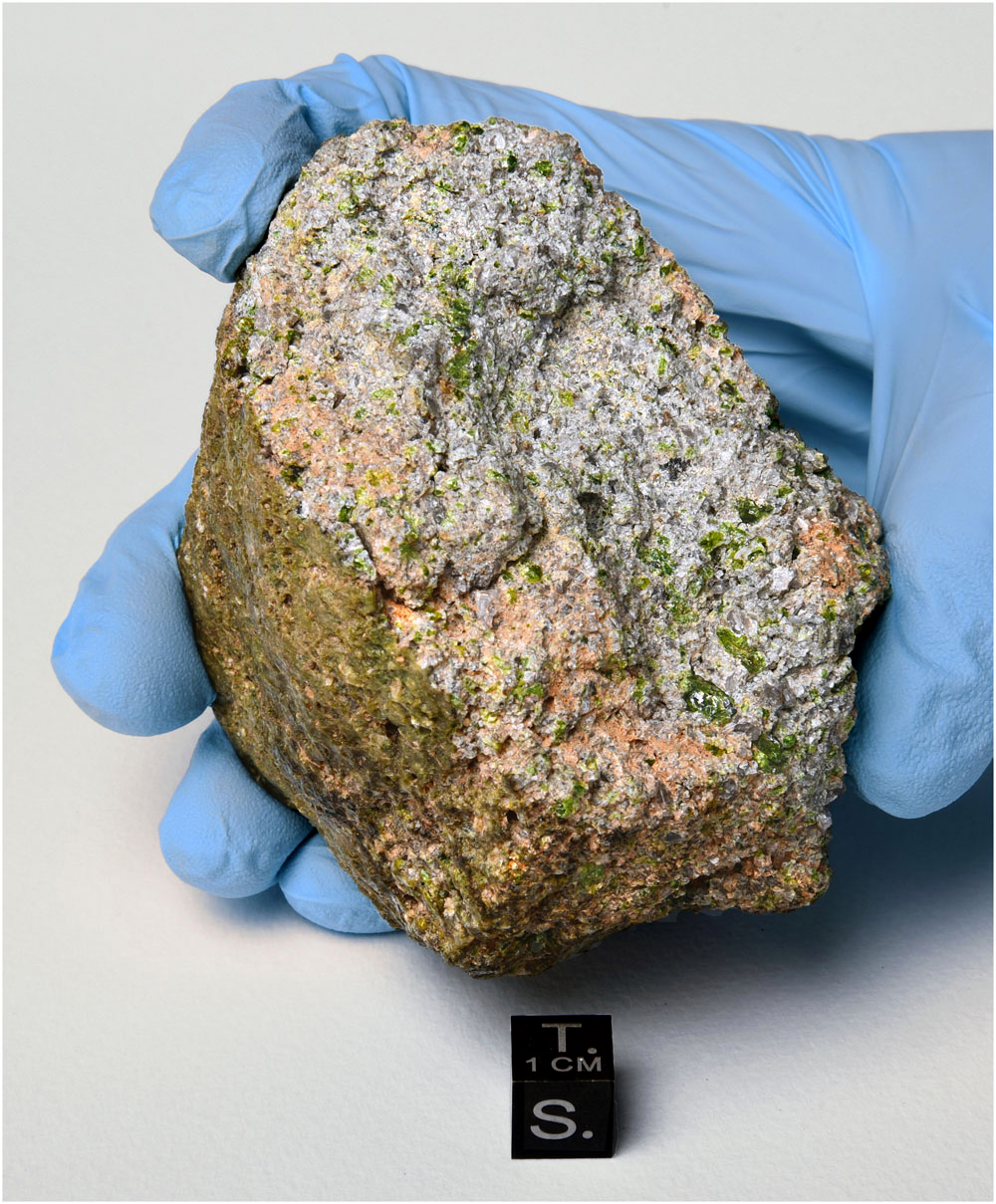
The main fragment of meteorite NWA 11119, the oldest dated whole rock.

One of the oldest Martian meteorites found on Earth, Allan Hills 84001 has been measured to have crystallized from molten rock 4.091 billion years ago.

The Genesis Rock (Lunar sample 15415), obtained from the Moon by astronauts during Apollo 15 mission, has been dated at 4.08 billion years. During Apollo 16, older rocks, including Lunar sample 67215, dated at 4.46 billion years, were brought back.

Some types of meteorite are older than the Earth, having formed in the early Solar System, before the planet formation process was completed. The meteorite Northwest Africa 11119 (NWA 11119) has been dated to 4.5648 ± 0.0003 billion years.

Some solid inclusions within meteorites are older than the surrounding rock. Calcium-aluminium rich inclusions (CAIs) in meteorites are the oldest solids that formed in the Solar System, so are conventionally used to set its formation date as 4567.30 ± 0.16 Myr. Pre-solar grains are even older; they formed in the interstellar medium and pre-date the formation of the Solar System. Some pre-solar grains extracted from the Murchison meteorite have been claimed to be 7 billion years old.

== See also ==
- Age of Earth – Scientific dating of the Earth
- Earliest known life forms
- History of Earth – Records of Earth's development
- Nature timeline

== Bibliography ==
- Zircons are Forever
- "Western Australia's Jack Hills". NASA Earth Observatory newsroom. Archived from the original on 2006-10-01.
- Bowring, S.A., and Williams, I.S., 1999. Priscoan (4.00–4.03 Ga) orthogneisses from northwestern Canada. Contributions to Mineralogy and Petrology, v. 134, 3–16.
- Stern, R.A., Bleeker, W., 1998. Age of the world's oldest rocks refined using Canada's SHRIMP. the Acasta gneiss complex, Northwest Territories, Canada. Geoscience Canada, v. 25, pp. 27–31
- Yu A., Lee C-D and Halliday, A. N.Lutetium-Hafnium and Uranium-Lead Systematics of Early-Middle Archean Single Zircon Grains, Ninth Annual Goldschmidt Conference. 2
