= Hadean =

Geologic eon, 4567–4031 million years ago

- 4567.3 ± 0.16 – 4031 ± 3 Ma
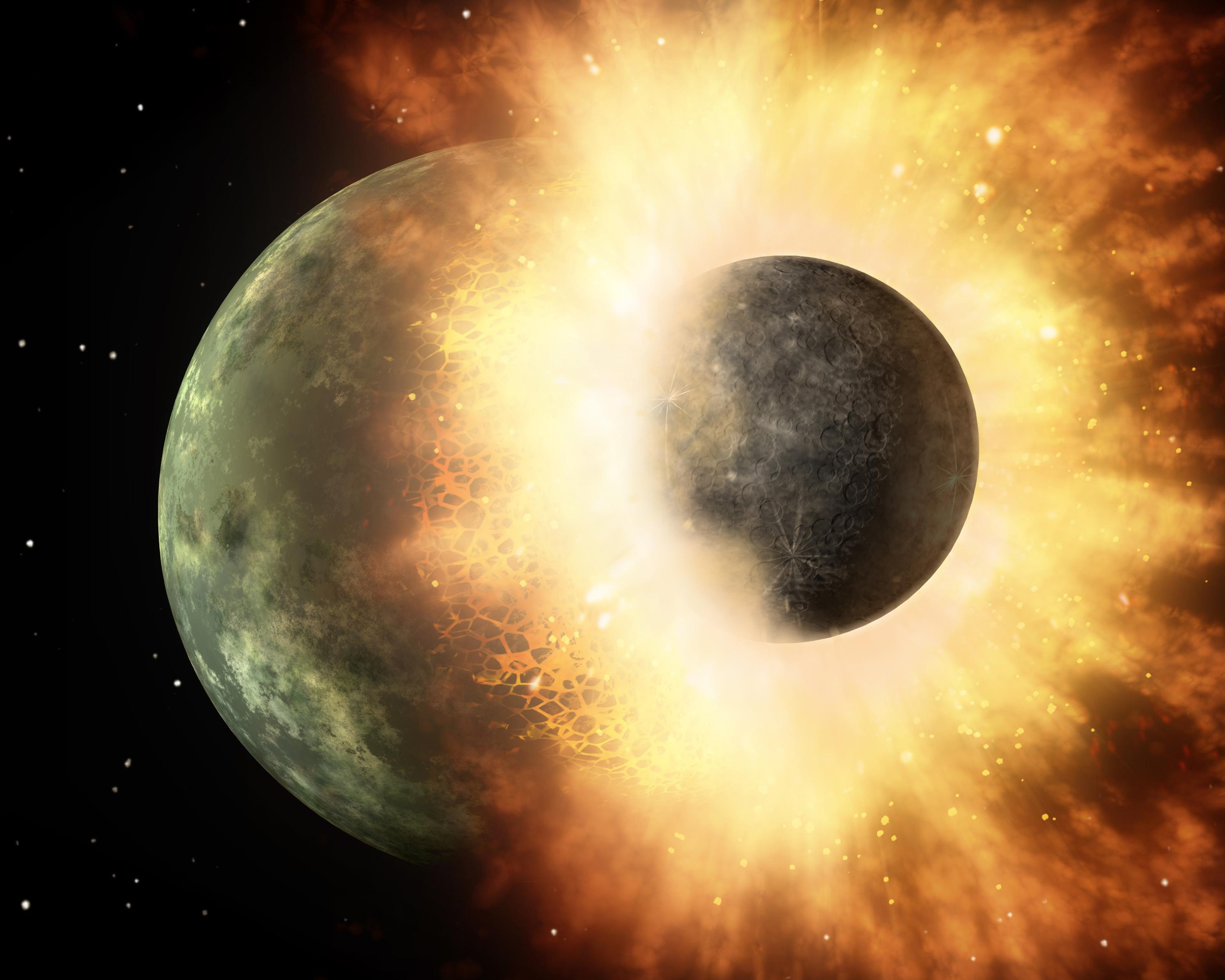
- Artist's depiction of a collision between two planetary bodies, similar to the hypothesized collision between Theia and Proto-Earth

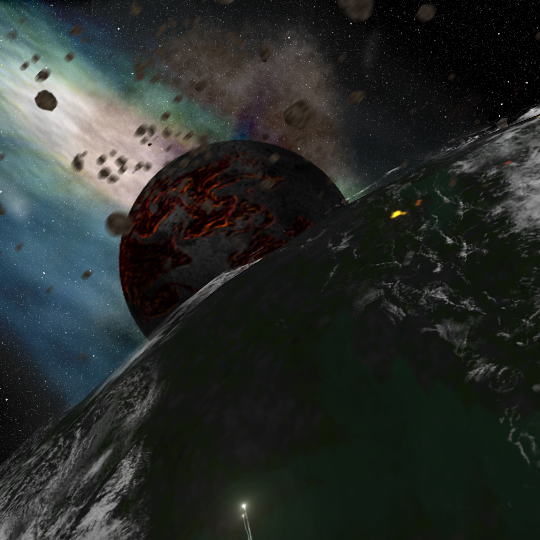
- Artist's illustration of Earth and the Moon towards the middle/end of the Hadean eon

Chronology
Vertical axis scale: Millions of years ago

Etymology
- Synonym(s): Priscoan Period; Harland et al., 1989

Usage information
- Celestial body: Earth
- Regional usage: Global (ICS)

Definition
- Chronological unit: Eon
- Stratigraphic unit: Eonothem
- First proposed by: Preston Cloud, 1972
- Time span formality: Formal
- Lower boundary definition: Age of the oldest solid material in the Solar System's protoplanetary disk (4567.30 ± 0.16) Ma
- Lower GSSA ratified: October 5, 2022
- Upper boundary definition: Ten oldest U-Pb zircon ages
- Upper boundary GSSA: Along the Acasta River, Northwest Territories, Canada; 65.1738°N 115.5538°W
- Upper GSSA ratified: 2023

The Hadean (/heɪˈdiːən, ˈheɪdiən/ hay-DEE-ən, HAY-dee-ən) is the first and oldest of the four geologic eons of Earth's history, starting with the planet's formation about 4.6 Ga (estimated 4567.30 ± 0.16 Ma set by the age of the oldest solid material in the Solar System—protoplanetary disk dust particles—found as chondrules and calcium–aluminium-rich inclusions in some meteorites about 4.567 Ga), and ending 4.031 Ga, the age of the oldest known intact rock formations on Earth as recognized by the International Commission on Stratigraphy. The interplanetary collision that created the Moon occurred early in this eon. The Hadean eon was succeeded by the Archean eon, with the Late Heavy Bombardment hypothesized to have occurred at the Hadean-Archean boundary.

Hadean rocks are very rare, largely consisting of granular zircons from one locality (Jack Hills) in Western Australia. Hadean geophysical models remain controversial among geologists: plate tectonics and the growth of cratons into continents may have started in the Hadean, but there is still uncertainty.

Earth in the early Hadean had a very thick hydride-rich atmosphere whose composition likely resembled the solar nebula and the gas giants, with mostly water vapor, methane and ammonia. As the Earth's surface cooled, vaporized atmospheric water condensed into liquid water and eventually a superocean covering nearly all of the planet was formed, turning Earth into an ocean planet. Volcanic outgassing and asteroid bombardments eventually altered the Hadean atmosphere into the nitrogen- and carbon dioxide-rich, weakly reducing Paleoarchean atmosphere.

== Etymology ==
The eon's name "Hadean" comes from Hades, the Greek god of the underworld, referring to the hellish conditions then prevailing on early Earth: the planet had just been formed from recent accretion, and its surface is thought to have been molten lava.

The term was coined by American geologist Preston Cloud, originally to label the period before the earliest known rocks on Earth. W. B. Harland later coined an almost synonymous term, the Priscoan period, from priscus, a Latin word for 'ancient'. Other, older texts refer to the eon as the Pre-Archean.

== Rock dating ==
Prior to the 1980s and the discovery of Hadean lithic fragments, scientific narratives of the early Earth explanations were almost entirely in the hands of geodynamic modelers.

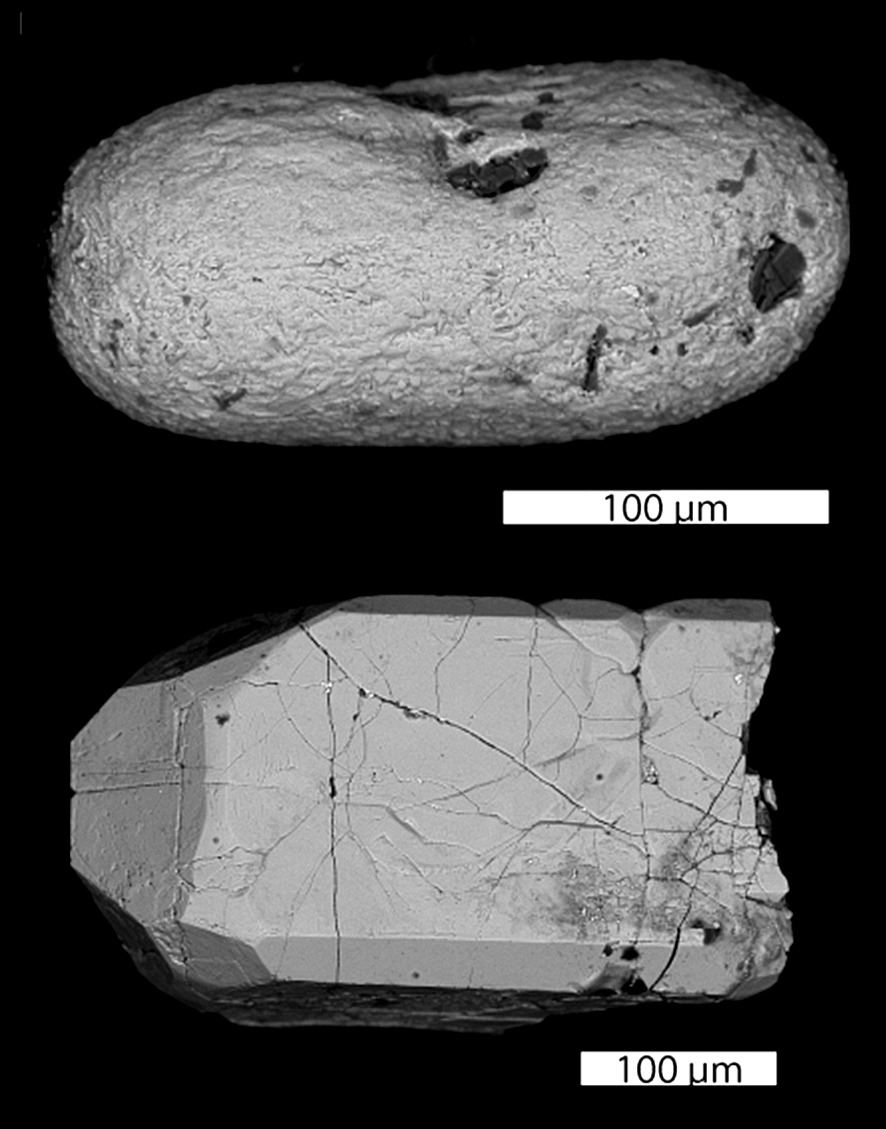
Backscatter electron micrograph of detrital zircons from the Hadean (4.404 ± 0.008 Ga) metasediments of the Jack Hills, Narryer Gneiss terrane, Western Australia

In the last decades of the 20th century, geologists identified a few Hadean rocks from western Greenland, northwestern Canada, and Western Australia. In 2015, traces of carbon minerals interpreted as "remains of biotic life" were found in 4.1-billion-year-old rocks in Western Australia.

The oldest dated zircon crystals, enclosed in a metamorphosed sandstone conglomerate in the Jack Hills of the Narryer Gneiss terrane of Western Australia, date to 4.404 ± 0.008 Ga. This zircon is a slight outlier, with the oldest consistently dated zircon falling closer to 4.35 Ga—around 200 million years after the hypothesized time of Earth's formation.

In many other areas, xenocryst (or relict) Hadean zircons enclosed in rocks younger than the zircons indicate that those rocks were formed on older terranes and have incorporated some of the older material. One example occurs in the Guiana shield from the Iwokrama Formation of southern Guyana where zircon cores have been dated at 4.22 Ga.

== Atmosphere ==
A sizable quantity of water would have been in the material that formed Earth. Water molecules would have escaped Earth's gravity more easily when the planet was less massive during its formation. Photodissociation by short-wave ultraviolet in sunlight could split surface water molecules into oxygen and hydrogen, the former of which would readily react to form compounds in the then-reducing atmosphere, while the latter (along with the similarly light helium) would be expected to continually leave the atmosphere (as it does to the present day) due to atmospheric escape.

Part of the ancient planet is theorized to have been disrupted by the impact that created the Moon, which should have caused the melting of one or two large regions of Earth. Earth's present composition suggests that there was not complete remelting as it is difficult to completely melt and mix huge rock masses. However, a fair fraction of material should have been vaporized by this impact. The material would have condensed within 2,000 years. The initial magma ocean solidified within 5 million years, leaving behind hot volatiles which probably resulted in a heavy CO_{2} atmosphere with hydrogen and water vapor. The initial heavy atmosphere had a surface temperature of 230 °C (446 °F) and an atmospheric pressure of above 27 standard atmospheres.

== Oceans ==
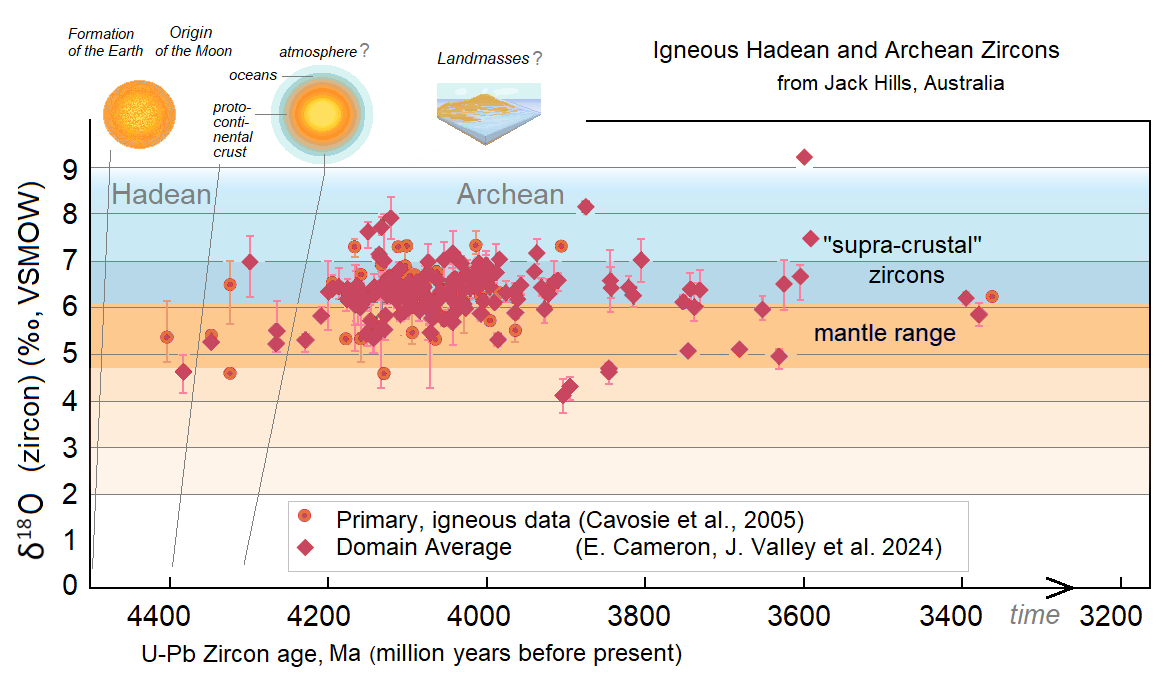
Hadean and Archean zircons with evaluation of δ^{18}O

Studies of zircons have found that liquid water may have existed between 4.0 and 4.4 Ga, very soon after the formation of Earth. Liquid water oceans existed despite the high surface temperature, because at an atmospheric pressure of 27 atmospheres, water remains liquid.

The most likely source of the water in the Hadean ocean was outgassing from the Earth's mantle. Bombardment origin of a substantial amount of water is unlikely, due to the incompatibility of isotope fractions between the Earth and comets.

Asteroid impacts during the Hadean and into the Archean would have periodically disrupted the ocean. The geological record from 3.2 Ga contains evidence of multiple impacts of objects up to 100 kilometres (62 mi) in diameter. Each such impact would have boiled off up to 100 metres (330 ft) of a global ocean, and temporarily raised the atmospheric temperature to 500 °C (932 °F). However, the frequency of meteorite impacts is still under study: the Earth may have gone through long periods when liquid oceans and life were possible.

The liquid water would absorb the carbon dioxide in the early atmosphere; this would not be enough by itself to substantially reduce the amount of CO_{2}.

== Plate tectonics ==
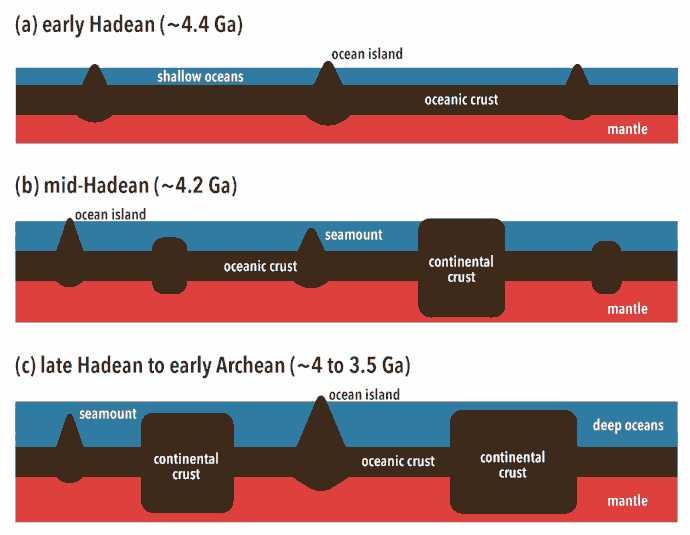
Evolution of continental crust and ocean depths (from Korenaga, 2021)

A 2008 study of zircons found that Australian Hadean rock contains minerals pointing to the existence of plate tectonics as early as 4 Ga (approximately 600 million years after Earth's formation). However, some geologists suggest that the zircons could have been formed by meteorite impacts. The direct evidence of Hadean geology from zircons is limited, because the zircons are largely gathered in one locality in Australia. Geophysical models are underconstrained, but can paint a general picture of the state of Earth in the Hadean.

Mantle convection in the Hadean was likely vigorous, due to lower viscosity. The lower viscosity was due to the high levels of radiogenic heat and the fact that water in the mantle had not yet fully outgassed. Whether the vigorous convection led to plate tectonics in the Hadean or was confined under a rigid lid is still a matter of debate. The presence of Hadean oceans is thought to have triggered plate tectonics.

Subduction due to plate tectonics would have removed carbonate from the early oceans, contributing to the removal of the CO_{2}-rich early atmosphere. Removal of this early atmosphere is evidence of Hadean plate tectonics.

If plate tectonics occurred in the Hadean, it would have formed continental crust. Different models predict different amounts of continental crust during the Hadean. The work of Dhiume et al. predicts that by the end of the Hadean, the continental crust had only 25% of today's area. The models of Korenaga, et al. predict that the continental crust grew to present-day volume sometime between 4.2 and 4.0 Ga.

== Continents ==
The amount of exposed land in the Hadean is only loosely dependent on the amount of continental crust: it also depends on the ocean level. In models where plate tectonics started in the Archean, Earth has a global ocean in the Hadean. The high heat of the mantle may have made it difficult to support high elevations in the Hadean. If continents did form in the Hadean, their growth competed with outgassing of water from the mantle. Continents may have appeared in the mid-Hadean, and then disappeared under a thick ocean by the end of the Hadean. The limited amount of land has implications for the origin of life.

== Possible life ==
Abundant Hadean-like geothermal microenvironments were shown by Salditt et al. to have the potential to support the synthesis and replication of RNA and thus possibly the evolution of a primitive life form. Porous rock systems comprising heated air-water interfaces were shown to allow ribozyme-catalyzed RNA replication of sense and antisense strands followed by subsequent strand dissociation, thus enabling combined synthesis, release and folding of active ribozymes. A study published in 2024 inferred the last common ancestor of all current life to have emerged during the Hadean, between 4.09 and 4.33 Ga.

Although the early part of the Late Heavy Bombardment happened during the Hadean, the impacts were frequent only on a cosmic scale, with thousands or even millions of years between each event. As Earth already had oceans, life would have been possible, but vulnerable to extinction events caused by those impacts. The risk would not depend upon the frequency of collision, but on the size of the impactor, and remains on the Moon suggest impactors bigger than the Chicxulub impactor that caused the extinction of dinosaurs.

== See also ==
- Chaotian (geology) – Proposed era of the Hadean eon
- Faint young Sun paradox – Paradox concerning water on early Earth
- Formation and evolution of the Solar System
- Hadean zircon – Oldest-surviving crustal material from the Hadean Eon
- History of Earth – Records of Earth's development – the first sections describe the formation of Earth
- Oldest dated rocks – Includes rocks over 4 billion years old from the Hadean Eon
- Precambrian – History of Earth 4600–539 million years ago
- Timeline of natural history
