= Jack Hills =

Range of hills in Western Australia

Coordinates: 26°07′S 117°09′E

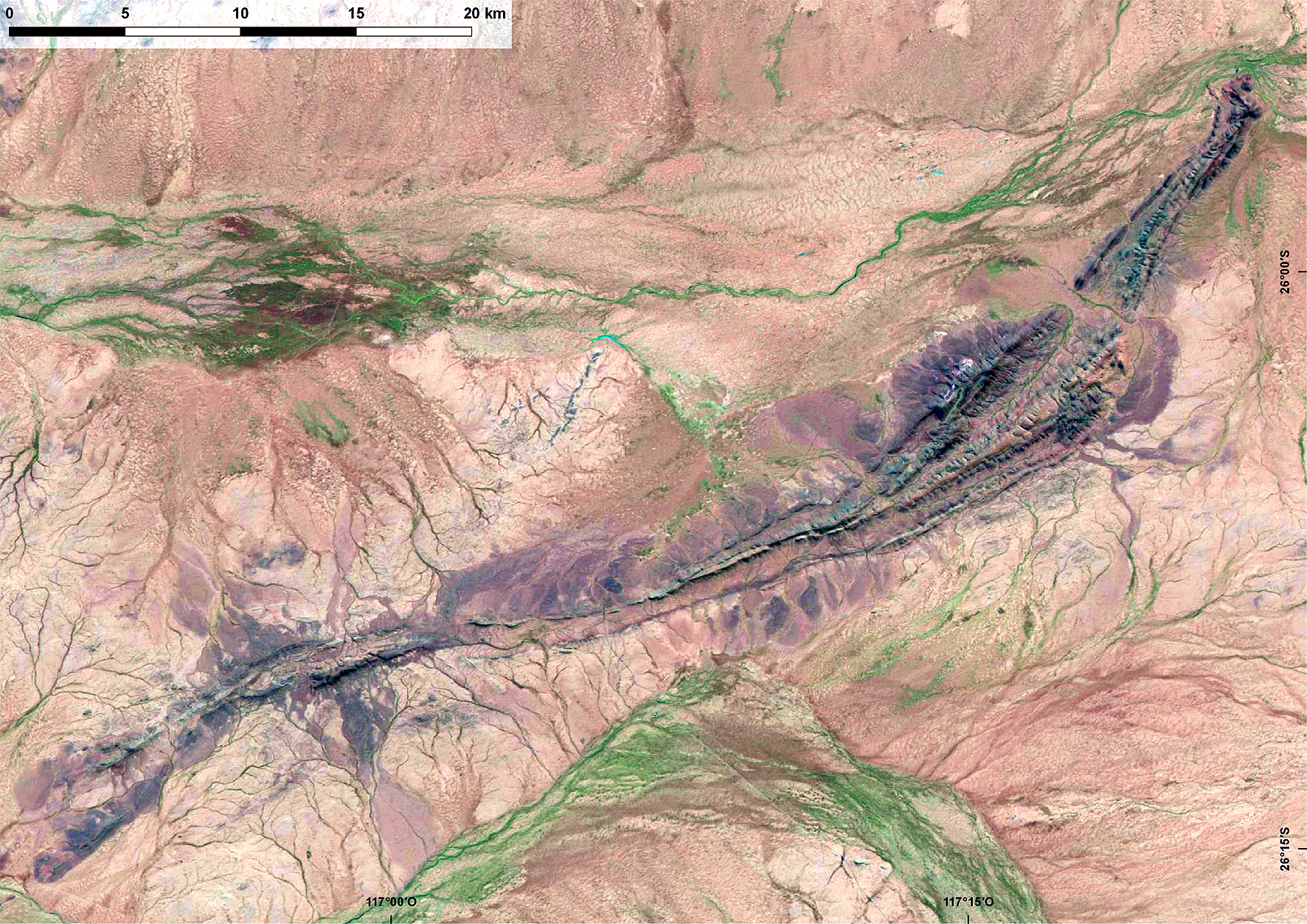
Satellite image

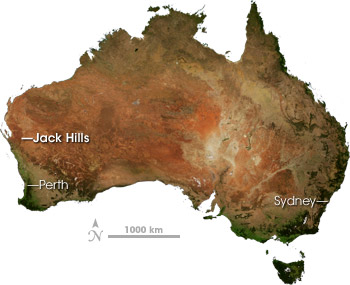
Location of the Jack Hills in Australia

The Jack Hills are a range of hills in Mid West Western Australia. They are best known as the source of the oldest material of terrestrial origin found to date: Hadean zircons that formed around 4.404 billion years ago. These zircons have enabled deeper research into the conditions on Earth in the Hadean eon. Potentially biogenic carbon isotope ratios have been identified for graphite embedded within a 4.1 billion-year-old zircon from the site.

== Geography ==
They are located on the border of the Shire of Murchison and the Shire of Meekatharra, south of the Murchison River, about 800 kilometres (500 mi) north of Perth.

== Geology ==
The Jack Hills are located in the Narryer Gneiss terrane of the Yilgarn craton, Western Australia, and comprise an 80 kilometres (50 mi) long northeast-trending belt of folded and metamorphosed supracrustal rocks.

Sedimentary siliciclastic rocks, interpreted as alluvial fan-delta deposits, are the major lithology. Minor mafic/ultramafic rocks and banded iron formation (BIF) are also found in the sequence. The overall sequence is generally considered to be a granulite gneiss, which has undergone multiple deformations and multiple metamorphic episodes. The protolith age of the Narryer Gneiss terrane is variable, but generally considered to be in excess of 3.6 Ga (billion years).

=== Oldest zircons on Earth ===
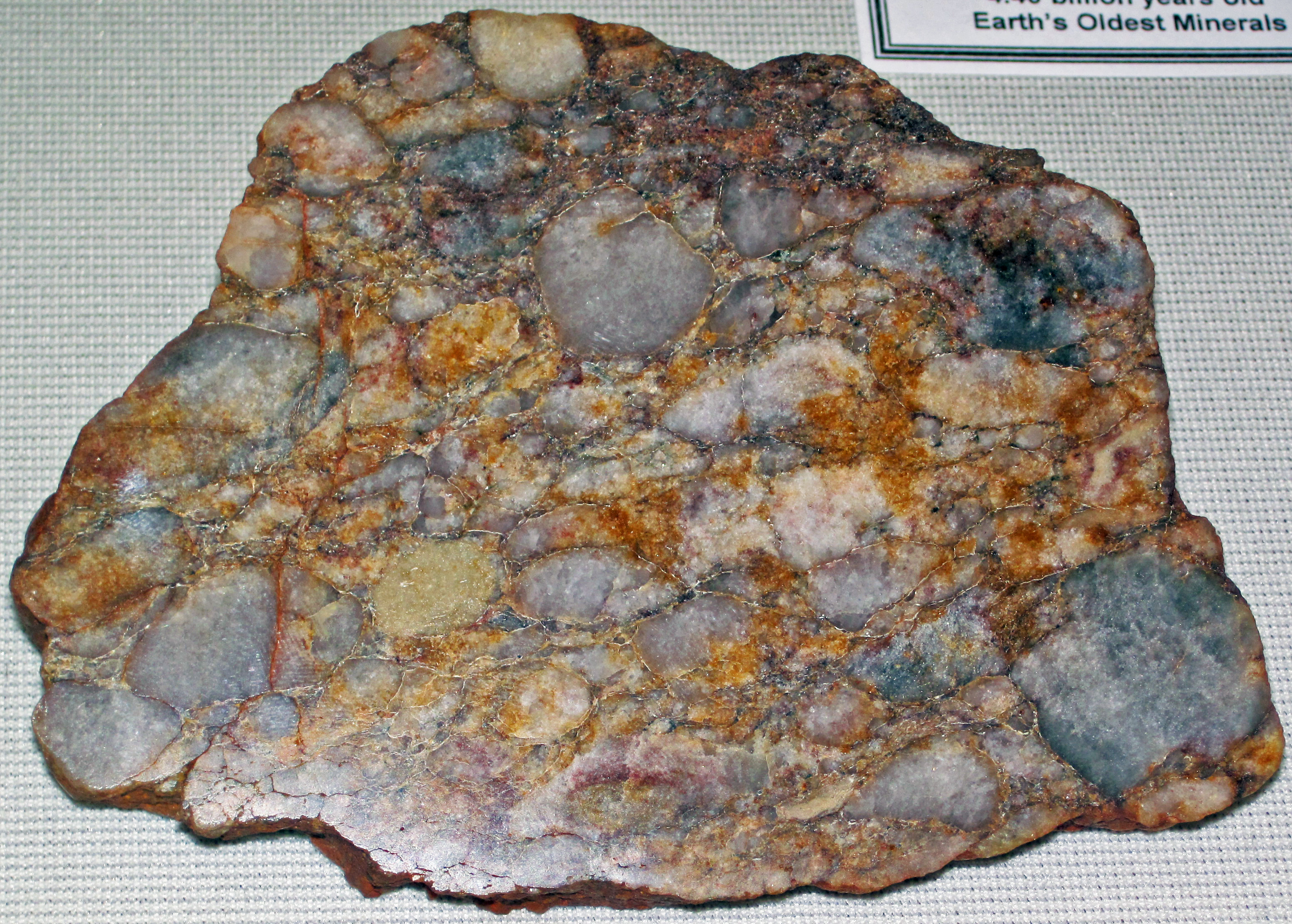
Quartz-pebble metaconglomerate (Jack Hills Quartzite), the rock type that contains Earth's oldest dated mineral grains (detrital zircon)

Detrital zircons with ages greater than 4 billion years old have been found in these rocks, and a 4,404 ± 8 million year old zircon was found at Erawondoo Hill; this is the oldest dated material originating on Earth; the date is in the Cryptic era of the Hadean eon. They were found within a unit of the supracrustal sequence, a metamorphosed conglomerate considered to have an age ~3.0 Ga. Given the detrital nature of the rock unit, the zircons are sourced from pre-existing rocks which were then weathered and the resultant sediment deposited as sedimentary rock.

The zircons and various aspects of their geochemistry provide evidence for the existence of continental-type crust on the surface of Earth during the Hadean eon, contrasting with earlier ideas on the earliest phase of Earth's history. Additionally, oxygen isotopic ratios in the zircons provide evidence for the presence of liquid water on the surface, if not a water ocean; also contrasting with earlier ideas on Earth's history. The hypothesis of humid and cool conditions before the Late Heavy Bombardment has been promoted as cool early Earth.

=== Economic geology ===
The Jack Hills banded iron formation (BIF) is the site of a non-operating minor iron ore mine owned by Mitsubishi Development Pty Ltd, a wholly owned subsidiary of Mitsubishi Corporation, which in the past exported up to 3 million tonnes per annum of high grade detrital hematite iron ore via the port of Geraldton.

Other companies operating in the area are also planning major magnetite BIF-based iron ore mines.

== Conservation ==
Due to its importance as a geology research site, part of the Jack Hills is included on the Australian National Heritage List. It was nominated for listing in 2003, received an interim listing in 2009, and a permanent listing in 2020.

=== IUGS geological heritage site ===
In respect of being the 'largest in situ repository of the oldest terrestrial crystals known to exist on Earth', the International Union of Geological Sciences (IUGS) included the 'Archean zircons of Erawondoo Hill' in its assemblage of 100 'geological heritage sites' around the world in a listing published in October 2022. The organisation defines an IUGS Geological Heritage Site as 'a key place with geological elements and/or processes of international scientific relevance, used as a reference, and/or with a substantial contribution to the development of geological sciences through history.'

== See also ==
- Geology of Australia
