= Protolith =

Rock from which a metamorphic rock is formed

A protolith (from Ancient Greek πρωτο (prōto) 'first' and λίθος (líthos) 'stone') is the original, unmetamorphosed rock from which a given metamorphic rock is formed.

For example, the protolith of a slate is a shale or mudstone. Metamorphic rocks can be derived from any other kind of non-metamorphic rock and thus there is a wide variety of protoliths. Identifying a protolith is a major aim of metamorphic geology.

Protoliths are non-metamorphic rocks and have no protoliths themselves. The non-metamorphic rocks fall into two classes: sedimentary rocks, formed from sediment, and igneous rocks, formed from magma. The source of the sediment of a sedimentary rock is termed its provenance.

Magmatic protoliths can be further divided into three categories: ultramafic rock, mafic rock, and quartzo-feldspathic rock. Similarly, sedimentary protoliths can be classified as quartzo-feldspathic, pelitic, carbonate rocks, or some mixture of the three.

On a geological time scale, the first protoliths were first formed shortly after the formation of the Earth during the Hadean eon.
