= Narryer Gneiss terrane =

Geological complex of ancient rocks in Western Australia

Narryer Gneiss Terrane
- Stratigraphic range: Archean >3.3 Ga
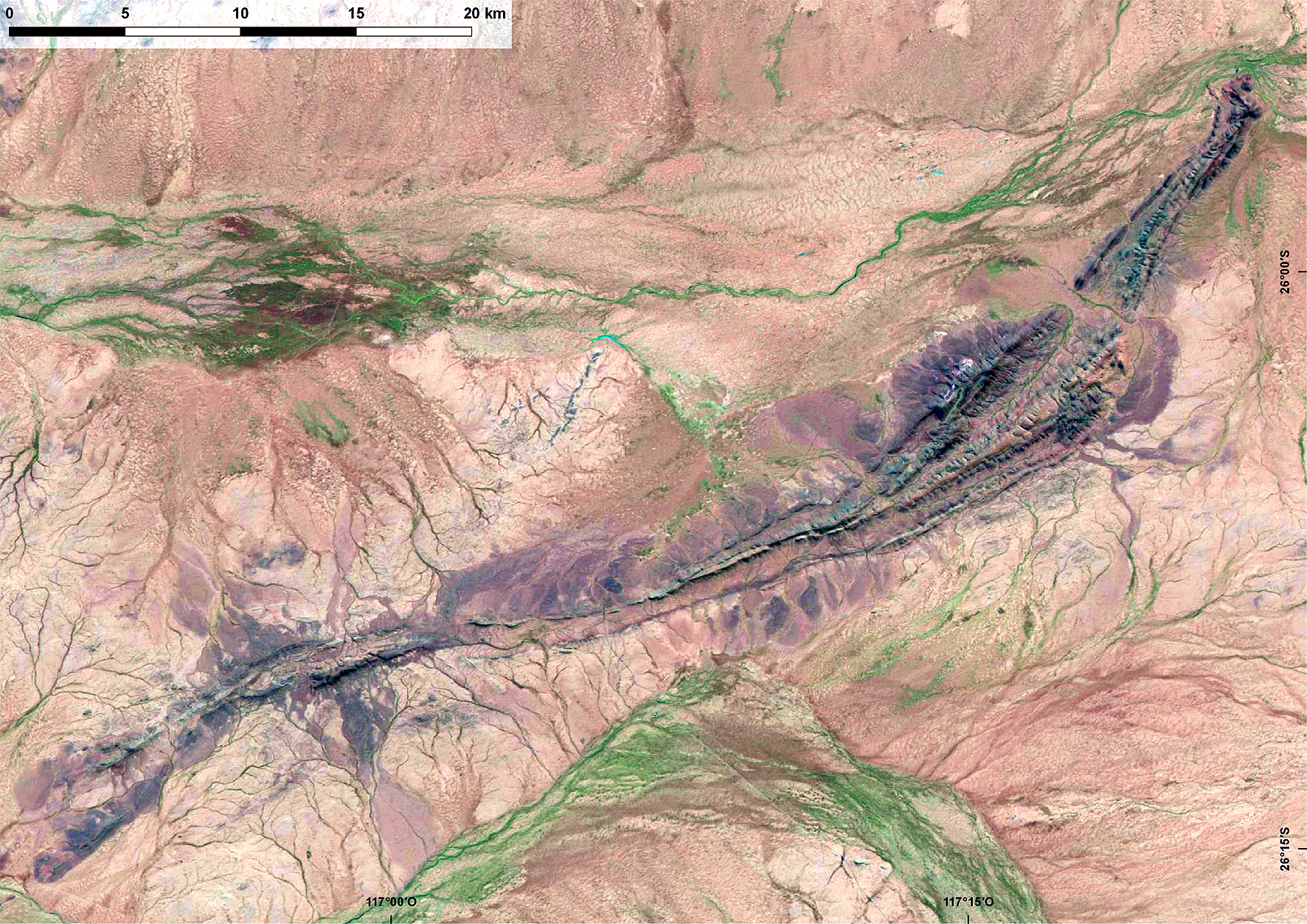
- Satellite image of the Jack Hills in the Narryer Gneiss Terrane
- Type: Geological complex
- Sub-units: Dugel Gneiss, Meeberrie Gneiss, Manfred Complex and metasedimentary rocks

Lithology
- Primary: Granite

Location
- Region: Yilgarn craton
- Country: Western Australia, Australia

The Narryer Gneiss terrane is a geological complex in Western Australia that is composed of a tectonically interleaved and polydeformed mixture of granite, mafic intrusions and metasedimentary rocks in excess of 3.3 billion years old, with the majority of the Narryer Gneiss terrane in excess of 3.6 billion years old. The rocks have experienced multiple metamorphic events at amphibolite or granulite conditions, resulting in often complete destruction of original igneous or sedimentary (protolith) textures. Importantly, it contains the oldest known samples of the Earth's crust: samples of zircon from the Jack Hills portion of the Narryer Gneiss have been radiometrically dated at 4.4 billion years old, although the majority of zircon crystals are about 3.6-3.8 billion years old.

The Narryer Gneiss terrane is adjacent to the northernmost margin of the Yilgarn craton and is abutted on the north by the Gascoyne Complex metasedimentary and metagranite orogen. The Narryer Gneiss terrane also includes parts of the Yarlarweelor Gneiss which abuts to Nabberu Basin metamorphic sequences of the Bryah-Padbury Basins, where it is present as discontinuous slivers of metamorphic rocks, pelites, metaconglomerates and gneisses caught up within regional strike-slip oblique thrust faults.

The Narryer Gneiss in this far-eastern region may form the basement to the 2.0-1.8 billion year old Proterozoic rocks, and the unconformity surface may be preserved within the thrust sheets.

The Narryer Gneiss terrane is divided into four major rock sequences (Myers 1990); the Dugel Gneiss, Meeberrie Gneiss, Manfred Complex, and unassigned polydeformed leucocratic gneisses and metasediments.

== Dugel Gneiss ==
The Dugel Gneiss is syenogranitic or monzogranitic in composition and this is interpreted as the protolith. The gneiss is leucocratic, with only minor amounts of biotite and muscovite. The rock exhibits variable intensity of metamorphic banding which may include grain size variations, and has a high degree of deformation around the margins, and preserves an amphibolite facies metamorphic assemblage. The gneiss is pervasively shot through with pegmatite veins.

Within the low-strain zones, the Dugel Gneiss exists as a medium-grained leucocratic metagranite with phenocrysts of K-feldspar which has recrystallized into granulite facies. The rock is greasy-looking with annealed quartz and feldspar, and syn-granulite facies leucosomes cutting across metamorphic banding, and subsequently deformed by later metamorphism.

The Dugel Gneiss is considered to be intruded into the older Meeberrie Gneiss, possibly as sheets or sills, but most contacts are overprinted by ductile metamorphic banding or mylonite zones.

== Meeberrie Gneiss ==
The Meeberrie Gneiss is a generally ductilely deformed banded gneiss of monzogranitic composition, and its protolith is interpreted as a set of monzogranite sills or lopolithic intrusions.

The gneiss is heavily banded by layers of amphibolite-K-feldspar-quartz of varying grainsize, plus networks of pegmatite veins. Most is strongly deformed, but least-deformed areas show a relict porphyritic to equigranular texture.

== Manfred Complex ==
The Manfred Complex is a heavily attenuated and discontinuous series of ultramafic to mafic cumulates contained within a matrix or wall-rocks of mixed Dugel and Meeberrie Gneisses. The rock types are primarily pyroxene gabbro to amphibolite, with rare serpentinised peridotite and dunite, occasionally containing relict igneous or metamorphic olivine.

These boudins of material range from centimetre-scale to ~100m thick and one kilometre long and, based on their position within anticlines and synclines in the Mount Narryer area, are interpreted to have intruded subparallel to bedding and are now strung out by shearing.

The Manfred Complex is interpreted to represent an early Archaean mafic to ultramafic layered intrusion which has been disaggregated. This disaggregation is partly tectonic, but in some areas evidence suggests that this was mostly achieved by the intrusion of the Dugel and Meeberrie gneisses as sills or sheets.

Geochronology on the Manfred Complex places its age at around 3.73 billion via Pb-Pb on zircon. This makes it the oldest recognised intrusive rock on the Earth, containing the oldest known igneous textures and mineral assemblages.

== Metasedimentary rocks ==
Metasedimentary rocks from within the Narryer Gneiss terrane account for about 10% of the outcrop and are variably deformed but uniformly of at least amphibolite grade metamorphism.

The most abundant rock types are quartzite and banded iron formation, with subordinate metamorphic gneisses, metaconglomerates and pelitic to semi-pelitic quartz-muscovite schists.

The conglomerates are primarily orthoquartzite monomict vein-pebble conglomerates, or polymict pebble conglomerates. In low-strain zones they preserve graded bedding, cross-bedding and heavy mineral-rich horizons.

These rocks provide the bulk of age determinations from the Narryer Gneiss terrane from detrital zircons, with the bulk of readings bracketing 3.5 to 3.75 billion years old, 3.35 to 3.45 billion years old, and a population of 4.1 to 4.2 billion years, with outliers of up to 4.4 billion years old.

== Structure ==
The Narryer Gneiss terrane has undergone many high-grade polyphase deformation events, with the most notable being at 2600 to 2700 Ma associated with granite-greenstone magmatism in the Yilgarn craton, following an event at ~3350 Ma of amphibolite facies, resulting in widespread re-equilibration of geochronometers, preceded by a deformation loosely constrained to ~3680 Ma and another predating the Meeberrie Gneiss and postdating the Manfred Complex, between 3680 and 3730 Ma.

Older structural grain is preserved in areas of low stress in subsequent deformations; the 2700 to 2600 Ma Yilgarn craton associated deformation has overprinted most other deformations, resulting in rotation of previous structures into parallelism with NE-trending upright folds and metamorphic banding.

Proximal to the Proterozoic orogens and thrust belts, the gneiss belt has become variably overprinted by later deformations. In the Bryah-Padbury Basin fold-thrust belt, Yarlarweelor Gneiss rafts exist as undeformed thrust plates of pelitic schist bounded by discrete mylonite zones, as well as deformed heavily overprinted gneiss blocks caught up within shear zones, some of which appear to preserve the unconformity surface.

== Sequence of events ==
A simplified sequence of events known from the Narryer Gneiss terrane of the Western Gneiss Belt of the Yilgarn craton is reproduced after A. F. Trendall (1991);

- 2000-1600 Ma;
  Basic dykes, related to the Gascoyne Complex and Capricorn Orogeny
- 2700-2600 Ma;
  Granite sheets and juxtaposition with the Yilgarn craton.
- 3350-3300 Ma; Amphibolite to granulite facies metamorphism
- ~3350-3400 Ma; deposition of metasedimentary rocks
- 3400 Ma; Intrusion of syenogranites to form Dugel Gneiss, basic and ultramafic dykes
- >3400-3680 Ma; Deformation
- ~3680 Ma; Meeberrie Gneiss
- >3680-3730 Ma; Deformation
- ~3780 Ma; Manfred Complex ultramafic-mafic layered intrusion
- >4100 Ma; Metasedimentary precursor gneiss to host the Manfred Complex
