= Isua Greenstone Belt =

Archean greenstone belt in southwestern Greenland

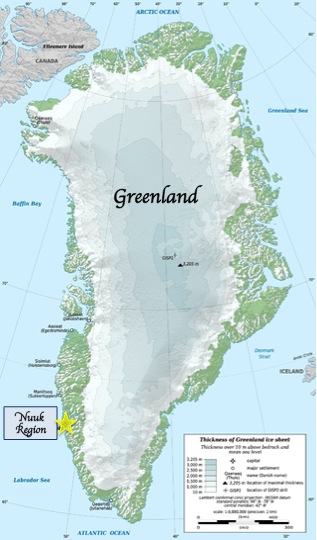
- The general location of the Isua Greenstone belt (Nuuk Region)

Dimensions
- Length: 35 km (22 mi)

Geography
- Country: Greenland

Geology
- Rock age: Archean
- Rock types: tonalite, mafic rocks, metasedimentary rocks, banded iron formations, granite and granodiorite

The Isua Greenstone Belt is an Archean greenstone belt in southwestern Greenland, aged between 3.7 and 3.8 billion years. The belt contains variably metamorphosed mafic volcanic and sedimentary rocks, and is the largest exposure of Eoarchaean supracrustal rocks on Earth. Due to its age and low metamorphic grade relative to many Eoarchaean rocks, the Isua Greenstone Belt has become a focus for investigations on the emergence of life and the style of tectonics that operated on the early Earth.

== Overview ==
The Isua Greenstone Belt, also known as the Isua supracrustal belt since it is composed primarily of supracrustal rocks, is located in southwestern Greenland, in the Isukasia terrane, near the Nuuk capital region. It forms the largest supracrustal enclave in the Itsaq Gneiss Complex, which predominantly comprises 3850 - 3600 million year old (Ma) felsic orthogneisses. The greenstone belt comprises two major sequences of metamorphosed mafic volcanic and sedimentary rocks, which were divided on the basis of zircon uranium-lead dating. These sequences are the 'southern terrane', which has an age of approximately 3800 Ma, and the 'northern terrane', which has an age of approximately 3700 Ma. The younger southern terrane is further subdivided into two subterranes: one predominantly comprising boninite-like metavolcanic rocks, and the other comprising tholeiitic and picritic metavolcanics. The Isua Greenstone Belt is bounded to the West by the Ivinnguit Fault, which divides the Eoarachaean Itsaq Gneiss Complex from younger (Mesoarchaean) rocks of the Akia Terrane. Elsewhere, it is bounded by felsic orthogneisses of the Itsaq Gneiss Complex. These show a similar age division to the supracrustal rocks of the Isua Greenstone Belt itself, with 3800 Ma gneisses to the south of the belt, and 3700 Ma gneisses to the north of the belt.

=== Scientific methods ===
A large number of geological and geochemical methods have been applied to the rocks of the Isua Greenstone Belt. These include subdivision of the various lithologies and units within the belt using a combination of geological mapping and U-Pb zircon dating, typically using sensitive high-resolution ion microprobe (SHRIMP), analyses; major and trace element chemistry; structural analyses; geothermobarometry and metamorphic modelling using phase diagrams to determine metamorphic conditions; and a wide range of stable, radiogenic, and short-lived isotope systems.

== Lithologies ==
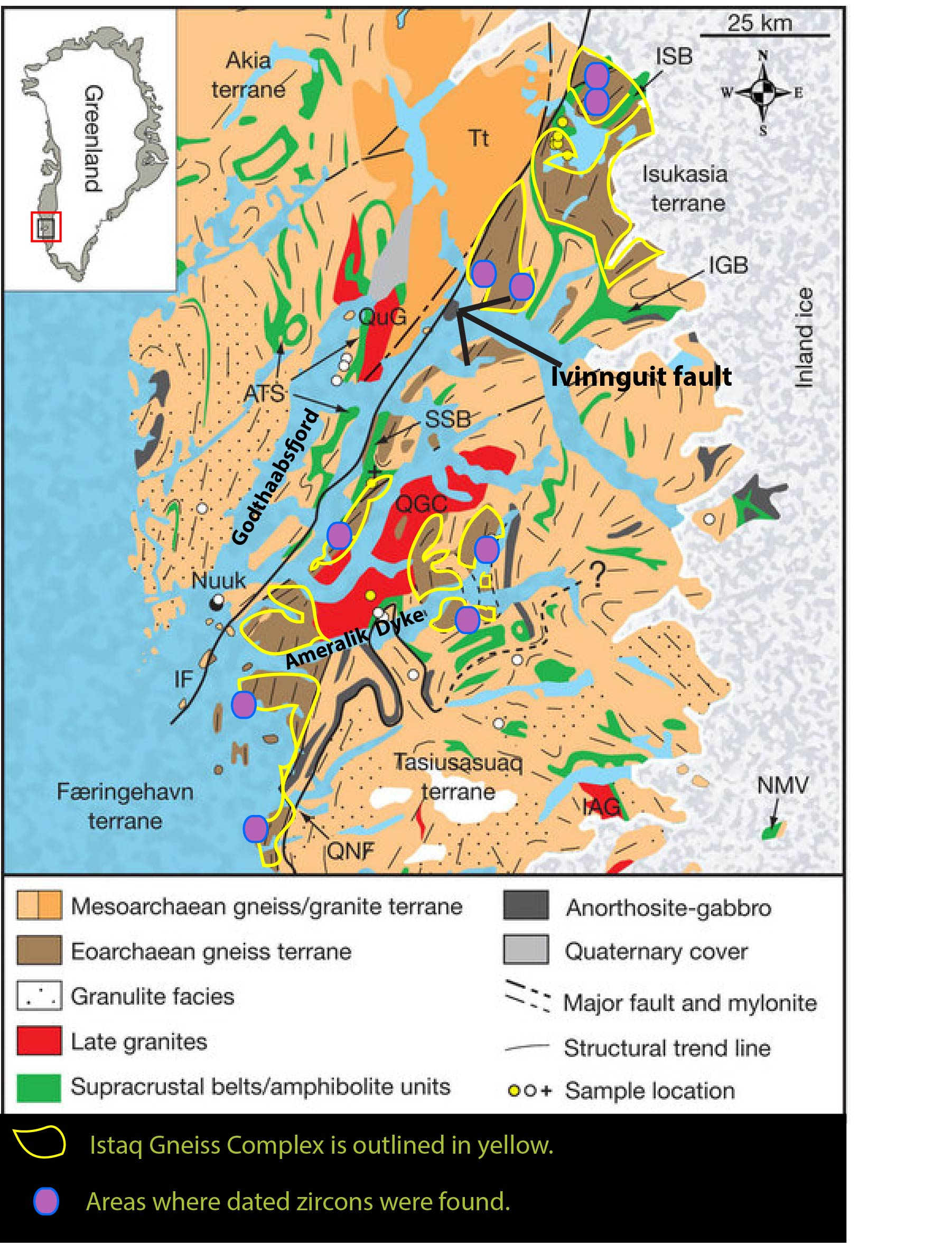
Map showing the location of the Isua Greenstone Belt (ISB, top right) within the Itsaq Gneiss Complex. Also shown are the younger Akia Terrane to the northwest, and Tasiusasuaq Terrane to the south. Modified from Nutman et al., 2007 and Naerra et al., 2012.

The Isua Greenstone Belt comprises many different lithologies. The most abundant rock types are mafic metavolcanic rocks with a range of compositions from boninite-like to tholeiites and picrites. Though boninitic amphibolites at Isua are often interpreted as evidence for the action of plate tectonics, these are not true boninites and non-plate tectonic models can also account for their formation. Texturally, the mafic metavolcanics include pillow lavas and pillow breccias, which indicate that the lavas erupted subaqueously, and requires the presence of surface water during the Eoarchaean. More felsic volcanic compositions have been observed, but it is not clear whether these represent volcanic or sedimentary rocks, and the only examples of potential andesite are significantly weathered.

The mafic volcanic sequences contain abundant meta-ultramafic rocks, including amphibolites, serpentinites, carbonated-peridotites and peridotite. The majority of these are widely accepted to be intrusive in origin, representing ultramafic cumulates. Some peridotite lenses have been interpreted as obducted mantle fragments, and used as evidence to support the operation of plate tectonics during the formation of the Isua Greenstone Belt. However, this interpretation is contested, and some studies suggest that all peridotites at Isua are cumulates, representing shallow level magma chambers and conduits with the volcanic sequences.

Metasedimentary rocks include banded iron formation and detrital quartzite, likely representing a metamorphosed siliciclastic sedimentary rock. Although they do not form part of the supracrustal belt itself, the belt is hosted in and in places intruded by tonalite-trondhjemite-granodiorite (TTG) orthogneisses.

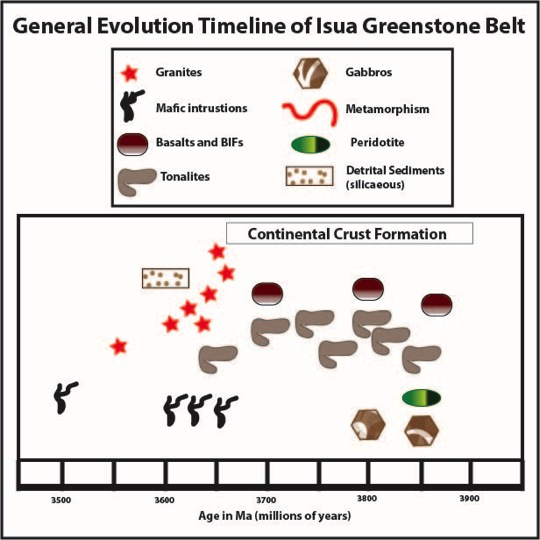
Cartoon of the age of various rock types formed during the evolution of the Isua Greenstone Belt. Note that the y-axis does not have a scale and vertical placement of the different lithologies has no significance.

== Tectonics ==
The tectonic setting in which the Isua Greenstone Belt formed remains contentious. Ideas can be broadly divided into plate tectonic models, in which the belt formed in one of several possible tectonic settings that exist on the modern day Earth, and non-plate tectonic or non-uniformitarian models, in which the Isua Greenstone Belt formed in a tectonic regime that was different to the modern day Earth. Plate tectonic models can be further subdivided into those that argue that the Isua Greenstone Belt or parts of it represent an ophiolite, a sliver of obducted oceanic crust and mantle, and those that argue that the belt represents an accretionary prism, formed in a subduction zone. Non-plate tectonic models generally suggest a heat pipe or mantle plume origin for the belt. This forms part of a much broader debate about when plate tectonics emerged on Earth, and whether the Archaean Earth operated under a fundamentally different tectonic regime.

=== Ophiolite controversy ===
Furnes et al. (2007) suggested that the presence of pillow lavas and closely spaced parallel dykes indicated that the Isua Greenstone Belt represented an ophiolite. The interpretation of the parallel dykes as a sheeted dyke complex was particularly important as sheeted dyke complexes are diagnostic of oceanic crust in ophiolites on the modern Earth. However, this interpretation was strongly contested on the basis that the sheeted dykes proposed by Furnes et al. were in fact a much younger generation of dykes, the ~3.5 billion year old (Ga) Ameralik dykes, and therefore unrelated to pillow lavas and other volcanic rocks of the belt. Other objections related to the composition of the dykes, which are unlike those found in modern-day ophiolites.

Despite the disagreement on the presence of a sheeted dyke complex at Isua, alternative lines of evidence have been proposed in support of an ophiolite origin for the belt. These are primarily based on the geochemistry of the volcanic rocks in the belt: tholeiitic amphibolites have been interpreted as metamorphosed island-arc tholeiites, and boninite-like amphibolites have been interpreted to represent metamorphosed boninites. However, subsequent studies have pointed out that the boninite-like amphibolites are in fact low-titanium basalts, with too little silica to classify as boninites, and recent geochemical modelling suggests that the entire volcanic compositional range at Isua can be explained without requiring a plate tectonic setting.

A further line of evidence used to invoke an ophiolite origin for the Isua Greenstone Belt is the presence of peridotite lenses in the volcanic sequence, particularly two dunite lenses referred to as 'lens A' and 'lens B'. These were argued to represent mantle rocks on the basis of their geochemistry, textures, and the presence of apparently high-pressure minerals. If true, the presence of mantle rocks within the supracrustal sequence at Isua would require that these rocks had been thrust to the surface, supporting an ophiolite origin for the belt. However, more recent work disputes a mantle origin for these rocks, and suggests that all features of the dunite lenses can be explained by them representing ultramafic cumulates formed in magma chambers that fed the eruption of volcanic rocks in the Isua Greenstone Belt. If this is the case, then no thrusting is required to bring them into contact with the supracrustal rocks, and the dunite lenses do not provide evidence that the Isua Greenstone Belt is an ophiolite.

=== Accretionary wedge models ===
The northeastern part of the Isua Greenstone Belt has been interpreted as part of an accretionary wedge on the basis of numerous small faults and apparent repetitions of the supracrustal sequence, with similarities to modern accretionary wedges. This was further supported by apparent metamorphic gradients in the same part of the belt, that are similar to those observed in modern subduction zones. However, this interpretation has been strongly contested on the basis that rock types and strain are extremely consistent across the various faults in the proposed accretionary wedge, and that peak metamorphic grades are consistent across the entire belt.

=== Non-plate tectonic models ===
Non-plate tectonic models include heat-pipe and mantle plume models, both of which suggest that the volcanic sequences at Isua formed through eruption of mantle derived magmas with minimal crustal input. In a heat-pipe model, rapid eruption of volcanic rocks and the corresponding removal of melt from the mantle below causes downward movement of the lithosphere and burial of mafic rocks. The buried mafic rocks eventually heat up and melt, producing the TTGs associated with the Isua Greenstone Belt. This model can account for the mafic composition of pelitic sediments at Isua, suggesting there was little felsic crust present during its formation, and the relatively simple deformation and uniform metamorphic grade observed across the belt. However, it has been criticised on a number of grounds, including the fact that there is no evidence that the 3.7 Ga volcanic rocks or TTGs ascended through the 3.8 Ga sequence, as would be expected for vertically stacked volcanism in a heat pipe model.

== Metamorphism ==
Following its formation, the Isua Greenstone belt has undergone two major metamorphic episodes. The first predates the formation of the <3.5 Ga Ameralik dykes and is associated with the Eoarchaean deformation at Isua. Amphibolite-facies conditions were reached across the belt between ~3.7 and 3.6 Ga. Though higher pressure conditions have been suggested locally on the basis of Ti-humite group minerals in peridotites, the reliability of these minerals to document high pressure processes has been questioned. The second event also reached amphibolite-facies conditions, and appears to have been a protracted event between ~2.9 and 2.6 Ga, followed by widespread retrogression of locally varying intensity. The effect of these two metamorphic and deformational events adds significant complexity to interpreting the primary geochemical compositions and geological structures present in the belt (e.g., see below).

== Possible signs of very early life ==
Because of its age, the Isua Greenbelt has long been the focus of studies seeking to identify signs of early terrestrial life. In 1996, geologist Steve Mojzsis and colleagues hypothesized that isotopically light carbon in the structure's carbon-rich layers was suggestive of biological activity having occurred there. "Unless some unknown abiotic process exists which is able both to create such isotopically light carbon and then selectively incorporate it into apatite grains, our results provide evidence for the emergence of life on Earth by at least 3,800 Myr before present."

In August 2016, an Australia-based research team presented evidence that the Isua Greenstone Belt contains the remains of stromatolite microbial colonies that formed approximately 3.7 billion years ago. However, their interpretations are controversial. If these structures are stromatolites, they predate the oldest previously known stromatolites, found in the Dresser Formation in western Australia, by 220 million years.

The complexity of the stromatolites found at Isua, if they are indeed stromatolites, suggest that life on Earth was already sophisticated and robust by the time of their formation, and that the earliest life on Earth likely evolved over 4 billion years ago. This conclusion is supported in part by the instability of Earth's surface conditions 3.7 billion years ago, which included intense asteroid bombardment. The possible formation and preservation of fossils from this period indicate that life may have evolved early and prolifically in Earth's history.

The stromatolite fossils appear wavy and dome-shaped, are typically 1–4 cm (0.4–1.6 in) high, and were found in iron- and magnesium-rich dolomites that had recently been exposed by melting snow. The surrounding rocks suggest that the stromatolites may have been deposited in a shallow marine environment. While most rocks in the Isua Greenstone Belt are too metamorphically altered to preserve fossils, the area of stromatolite discovery may have preserved original sedimentary rocks and the fossils inside them. However, some geologists interpret the structures as the result of deformation and alteration of the original rock.

The ISB sedimentary layers containing the possible stromatolites overlay volcanic rocks that are dated to 3.709 billion years old and are capped by dolomite and banded iron formations with thorium-uranium zircons dated to 3.695 ± 0.4 billion years old. All layers, including those bordering the stromatolites, experienced metamorphism and deformation after deposition, and temperatures not exceeding 550 °C (1,000 °F).

The identity of the ISB features as stromatolites is controversial, because similar features may form through non-biological processes. Some geologists interpret the textures above the putative stromatolites as sand accumulation against their sides during their formation, suggesting that the features arose during the sedimentary process, and not through later, metamorphic deformation. However, others suggest that the rocks are so altered that any sedimentary interpretations are inappropriate.

In 2016, geologist and areologist Abigail Allwood stated that the discovery of Isua stromatolites makes the emergence of life on other planets, including Mars early after its formation, more probable. However, in 2018, she and a team of additional geologists published a paper that raises significant questions as to the origin of the structures, interpreting them as arising from deformation. Thus, the ISB stromatolites remain a subject of ongoing investigation.

== See also ==
- Archean subduction
- Nuvvuagittuq Greenstone Belt
