= Eastern Pilbara Craton =

Carton in Western Australia

A map showing the present day boundaries of the exposed Pilbara Craton in red, the Eastern Pilbara region outlined in blue, and various local lithologies

The Eastern Pilbara Craton is the eastern portion of the Pilbara Craton located in Western Australia. This region contains variably metamorphosed mafic and ultramafic greenstone belt rocks, intrusive granitic dome structures, and volcanic sedimentary rocks. These greenstone belts worldwide are thought to be the remnants of ancient volcanic belts, and are subject to much debate in today's scientific community. Areas such as Isua and Barberton which have similar lithologies and ages as Pilbara have been argued to be subduction accretion arcs, while others suggest that they are the result of vertical tectonics. This debate is crucial to investigating when/how plate tectonics began on Earth. The Pilbara Craton along with the Kaapvaal Craton are the only remaining areas of the Earth with pristine 3.6–2.5 Ga crust. The extremely old and rare nature of this crustal region makes it a valuable resource in the understanding of the evolution of the Archean Earth.

== Description ==
The Eastern Pilbara Craton is geologically significant due to its age and the types of lithology found within it. Within the Eastern Pilbara Craton there are 2 distinct lithologic divisions: (1), early Earth crust (3.8–3.53 Ga); (2), intrusive granitic domes along with greenstone belts (3.53–3.23 Ga). What separates this East Pilbara terrane from the rest of the Pilbara region are regional unconformities and that these rocks were once part of or deposited on the original Pilbara Craton and are still exposed today. These groups not only differ in relative age, but also in composition.

=== Archean crust (3.8–3.53 Ga) ===
The remnants of the Archean crust in the region can be found within various granitic complexes in the Eastern Pilbara. Xenoliths of 3.58 Ga gabbroic anorthosite were found within the Shaw Granitic Complex. The Warrawagine Granitic Complex contains 3.66–3.58 Ga biotite tonalite gneiss. Presence of 3.8–3.6 Ga detrital zircons also suggests crustal erosion 300 Ma prior to the oldest rocks found.

=== Granitic domes and greenstone belts (3.57–3.23 Ga) ===
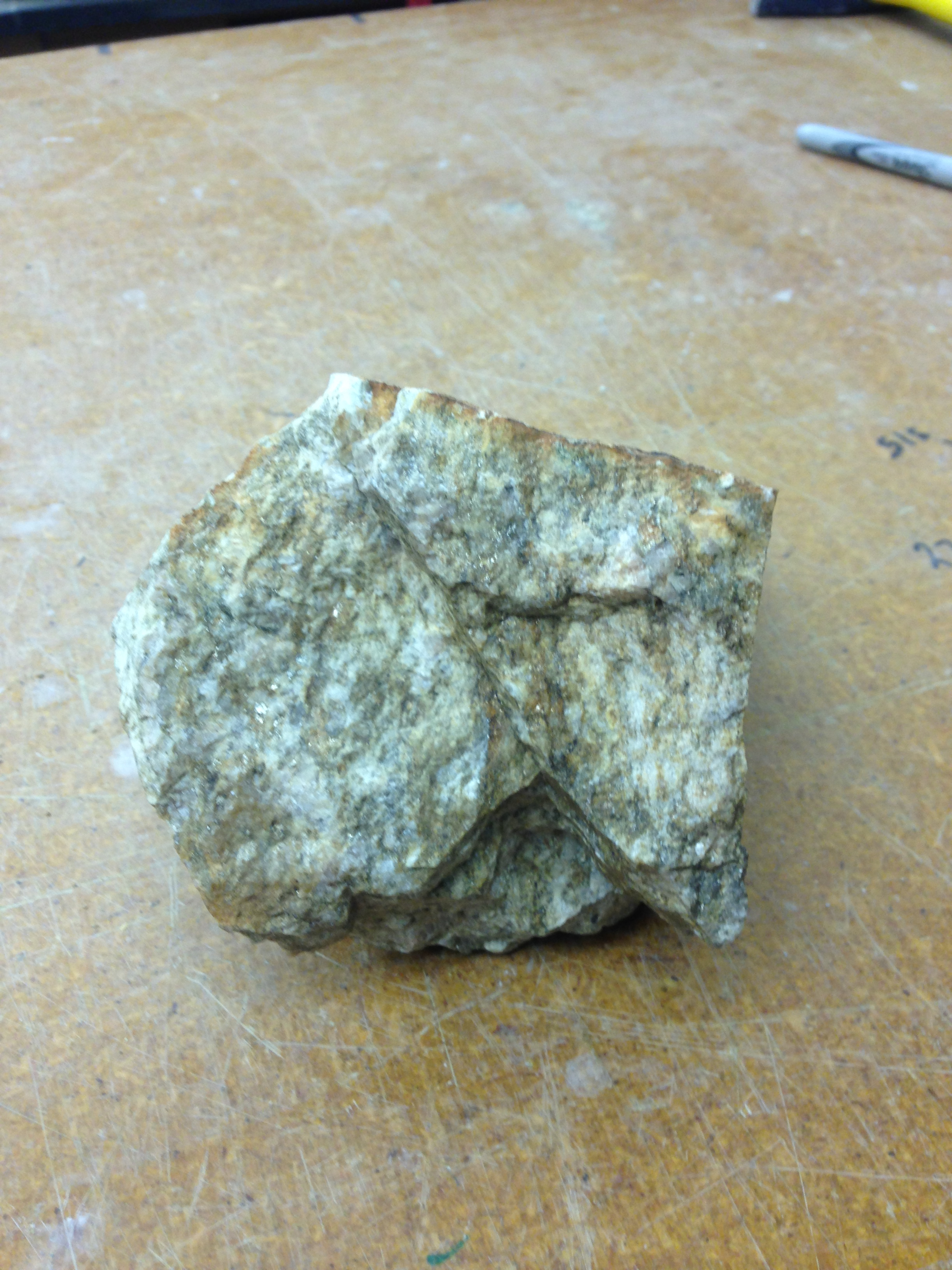
Granitic rock sample from Pilbara. The light/white/yellow color distinguishes it from greenstones also found in that region. TTG melts were the sources of rocks like these.

The dominant lithologies and associated structures in the Eastern Pilbara region are the granitic domes and greenstone belts. The granitic domes are mostly TTG or TTG-like in composition. The greenstone belts are interpreted as altered komatiitic basalts and volcanosedimentary rocks. These rocks range from ultramafic, mafic, and felsic in composition. Ultramafic rocks such as dunites can also be found.

==== TTG ====
TTGs are an aggregation of certain rocks (tonalite-trondhjemite-granodiorite), that form when hydrous, mafic crust is melted at high pressure. These rocks are critical to the formation of Archean greenstone complexes due to the low density, intrusive nature of the rocks. TTGs are found in other Archean greenstone belts such as Isua and Barberton. The processes that form TTGs are debated. Some authors attribute TTG formation to subduction activity, while others attribute the origin of these melts to the direct melting of the lithosphere by mantle plumes. The debate of the origin of the TTGs is a key topic in the debate of when plate tectonics began.

=== Regional structures ===
Simplified cross-section of dome and keel structure

The structures observed in this region are interesting, and unique to areas where rocks of similar ages are found. Similar dome and keel structures are found in the Barberton Greenstone Belt. These structures were interpreted to be the result of partial convective overturn. These lighter colored domes surrounded by the darker colored greenstone belts are easily seen in satellite imagery, and can also be seen in the map above. A cross-section of this structure is provided, and the steeply dipping anticlines and synclines are characteristic of this type of structure. The interior of the granitic domes are mostly undeformed, however the margins and the greenstone belts are heavily deformed, and the metamorphic grade depends on the region's proximity to the dome-keel margins.

== Formation and history ==
The early history of this region was dominated by volcanic activity, magmatic intrusion and deformation. The Eastern Pilbara Terrane is mostly volcanic in nature, and this volcanic activity occurred in relatively short, and repeated cycles These ultramafic-mafic-felsic cycles which last approximately 10–15 Myr each are accompanied by metamorphism/deformation, and followed by long pauses (approx. 75 myr) and clastic sediment deposition. Some of the granitic intrusions in the region are subvolcanic, which can be determined through the comparative chemical analysis of the intrusion and associated greenstones. All of these cycles are interpreted to be the result of successive mantle plume events. These events resulted in the overall dome (granite) and syncline (greenstone) structure of the region, which can still be seen on modern geologic maps. The overall thickness of this succession during its formation and the geochemical analysis indicating that these rocks were mantle derived supports that this region was formed as a thick volcanic plateau.

=== Partial convective overturn ===
Partial convective overturn model, adapted from Van Kranendonk 2011

Partial convective overturn is a mechanism by which the geology and structure of the Pilbara Craton can be explained. This mechanism involves cold, dense material sinking into hot, less dense material as it rises in dome/pillar-like formations. This results in steeply dipping anticline–syncline complex, in which the greenstone at the bottom of the syncline experiences the most deformation. As seen in the figure, this process can be described in a simplified version, through 2 stages. In stage 1, heat being radiated from the partially melted granite rising is insulated by the cold greenstone cover, and as a result, the greenstone at the bottom of the formation begins to "drip" down, making room for the granitic to rise further. In stage 2, the small, sporadic greenstone drips and granitic pillars have consolidated into fewer, larger domes and keels as they continue to rise. The result is a structural geology similar to what we see in Pilbara. This process is also known as vertical tectonics.
