= Geology of Aruba =

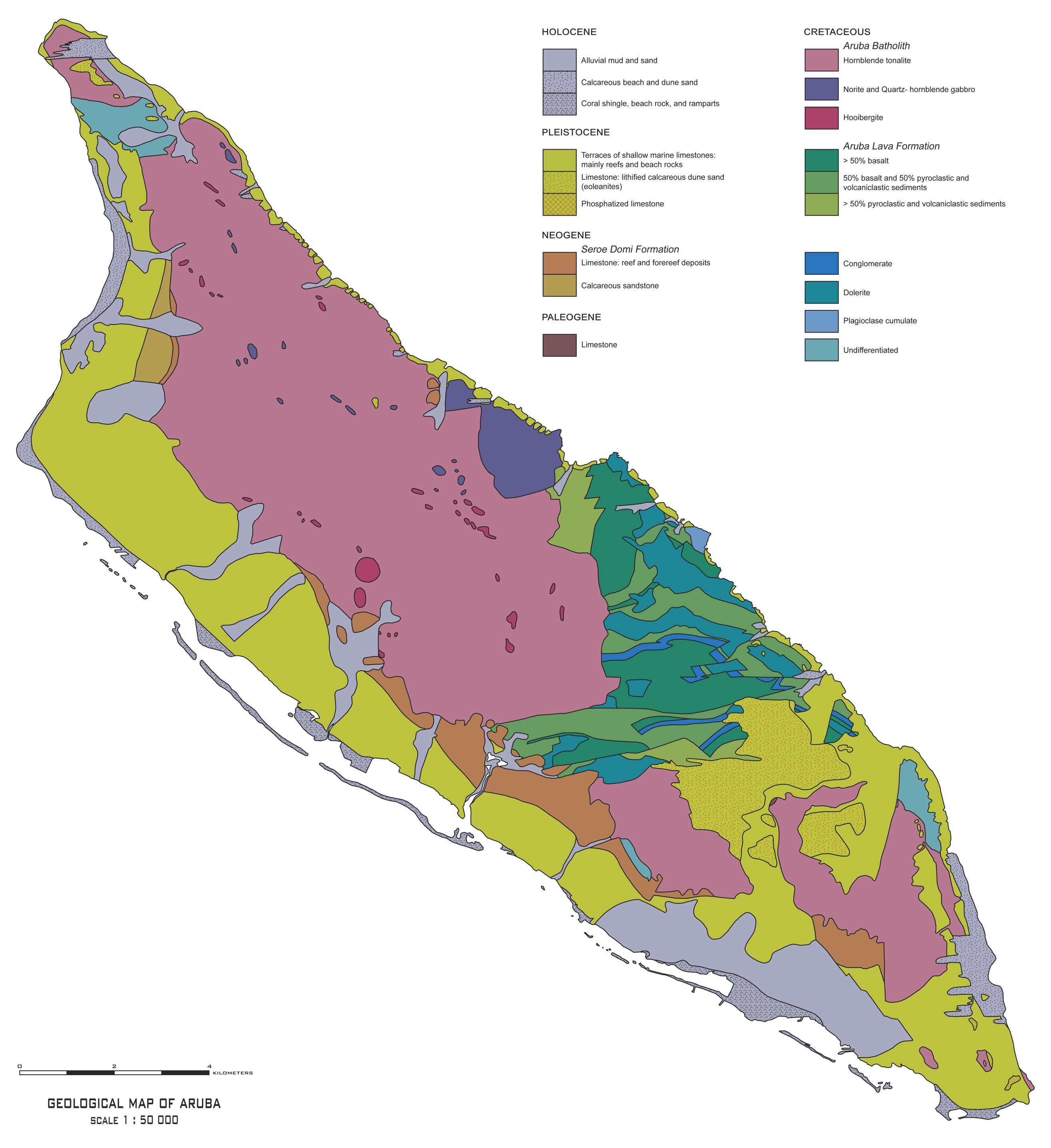
Geological map of Aruba. Source: Rijks Geologische Dienst.

The island of Aruba formed within the past 145 million years, beginning in the Cretaceous, as part of the Lesser Antilles island arc. The island is built on a thick sequence of volcanic rock, but also has carbonate sediment deposits because it was submerged for parts of its existence.

== Stratigraphy and geologic history ==
The three kilometer thick Aruba Lava Formation is the oldest unit on the island, from the Cretaceous, which is intruded by a tonalite pluton. Older geologic research referred to this unit as the Diabase-Schist-Tuff Formation. Although mainly basalt, it also includes volcaniclastic conglomerate, dolerite, chert and chert limestone. Small sedimentary inclusions preserve ammonite fossils, suggesting it formed during the Turonian, while rubidium-strontium dating gives an age of 85 to 70 million years ago. Remnant pillow lava and sheet-flows record ancient eruptions, flowing down to and often cooling very quickly in seawater. The intrusion of the pluton caused contact metamorphism in some of the surrounding basalt and left behind epidote, hornblende, albite and uralite in the rocks. Geochemists have found that the major and trace element chemistry of the rocks is almost the same as in Curaçao.

The hornblende tonalite batholith is a major part of Aruba's geology. The "roof" of the formation is made out of the oldest intrusive material, norite and gabbro. The norite shifts from hypersthene to augite while the gabbro has abundant augite, hornblende and quartz. The tonalite is mainly plagioclase, interstitial quartz and potassium feldspar as well as dark minerals like hornblende, biotite, clinopyroxene and magnetite. There are also small occurrences of trondhjemite.

=== Cenozoic (66 million years ago-present) ===
A small outcrop of Eocene and Oligocene limestone occurs at Butucu Ranch in east-central Aruba, without quartz, but containing fossils from the time period such as algae and foraminifera. Named for exposures on Curaçao, the Neogene Seroe Domi Formation is on the southeastern side of Aruba and includes a series of detrital limestone and conglomerates.

In 1942, two French friars using divining rods instructed a team to drill the Oranjestad borehole down 302 meters, which revealed the Oranjestad sands and clays from the Pliocene and Late Miocene, as well as a hypersaline artesian well. Five limestone terraces formed during the past 2.5 million years of the Quaternary.
