= Geology of Sint Maarten =

Sint Maarten, forms the southern portion of the island of Saint Martin in the northern part of the Lesser Antilles islands arc. It was formed by volcanic activity, followed by plate tectonics, which pushed these cooled magma formations upwards. When the sea level rose, Sint Maarten split from the islands of Anguilla and Saint Barthélemy later. The island consists of volcanistic rocks from the Eocene era. There is evidence of a fossilized geothermal system which existed in the Oligocene period.

== Location ==
Sint Maarten, forms the southern portion of the island of Saint Martin in the northern part of the Lesser Antilles islands arc.

== Formation ==
The Caribbean was a geologically active region with tectonic movements causing several earthquakes and volcanic activity. When these volcanoes, which were often submerged under water, erupted, the magma was rapidly cooled by the ocean water, and solidified. These solidified masses were pushed upwards by plate tectonics and formed islands. About one million years ago, when the sea level was 35 m (115 ft) below what it is today, Saint Martin shared a landmass with the islands of Anguilla and Saint Barthélemy, and split later.

== Composition ==
Saint Martin consists of andesite tuff and tuff breccia from the middle and late Eocene, intruded by hypabyssal basalt, quartz diorite and younger andesite. The 2,000–3,000 m (6,600–9,800 ft) thick volcaniclastic and carbonate rocks, dip at an angle of approximately 30° toward the south-southeast. These rocks are intruded by two calcium-alkaline plutonic bodies consisting of tonalite and granodiorite, with the same texture, petrology, and chemical evolution. These rocks are dated to approximately 30 million years.

Volcanic activity led to metamorphism of many rocks and the tilting and folding of the tuff series. Limestone and marl was later deposited atop the eroded volcanic rocks as volcanic activity shifted elsewhere. An example of this limestone sequence is the Point Blanc rock formation, a layered rock that is the result of crystallisation of limestone and dated to approximately 15 million years ago, a sample of which is held in the Sint Maarten Museum.

== Geothermal system ==
A fossilized deep geothermal system is found in the Fort Hill–Kool Bay area over a distance of 4 km (2.5 mi). It was formed by the intrusion of quartz-diorite rocks in the Oligocene era into earlier Eocene volcanic rocks, forming an alteration pattern. The salinity and temperature decreased outward from the intrusion.
