= Geology of Saba =

Saba is a small volcanic island in the Lesser Antilles Arc. It forms the surface of a large stratovolcano that rises 1,500 m (4,900 ft) above the sea floor. It was formed over the years from multiple overlapping lava domes and eruptions.

== Formation ==
Saba is a small island of 5 km (3 mi) diameter which forms the surface of a large volcano that rises 1,500 m (4,900 ft) above the sea floor. It is the northernmost volcanic island in the Lesser Antilles Arc of active volcanoes. It is a complex stratovolcano constructed from multiple overlapping lava domes and coarse pyroclastic aprons, rather than a single eruptive cone. The central peak, Mount Scenery (870 m), a dormant volcano, represents a younger dome perched atop older dome structures and partially conceals a prominent sector collapse scar on the southwestern flank, where the populated areas are situated. Zion's Hill or Hell's Gate is part of a basaltic andesite lava flow. The Flat Point Peninsula, where the island's airport is located, was formed by a large lava flow that entered the sea on the north eastern flank.

The island's oldest volcanic rocks date back roughly 420,000 years, while younger pyroclastic surges have been radiocarbon-dated to around 280 years Before Present. Seismic swarms in the 1990s correlated with elevated hydrothermal temperatures, hinting at possible magma movement or deep groundwater circulation beneath the island. In the past 10,000 years, Saba has had only one confirmed historic eruption, in 1640 CE.

== Composition ==
The volcanic deposits consist of andesite and dacite rocks with low calcium and medium potassium content. The presence of crustal xenoliths like fossiliferous limestone and plagiogranite indicates assimilation of material from the underlying Saba Bank, a carbonate platform located southwest of the island formed during the Mesozoic period. The dikes and active geothermal zones, including hot springs, have sulfur mineralization along the coasts. Magma mixing is visible in the field with certain chemicals especially involving trace elements, which can only be explained if the magma interacted with surrounding rocks during its evolution.
