= Pilbara Craton =

Geologic formation in Western Australia

- Stratigraphic range: Eoarchean to Paleoproterozoic
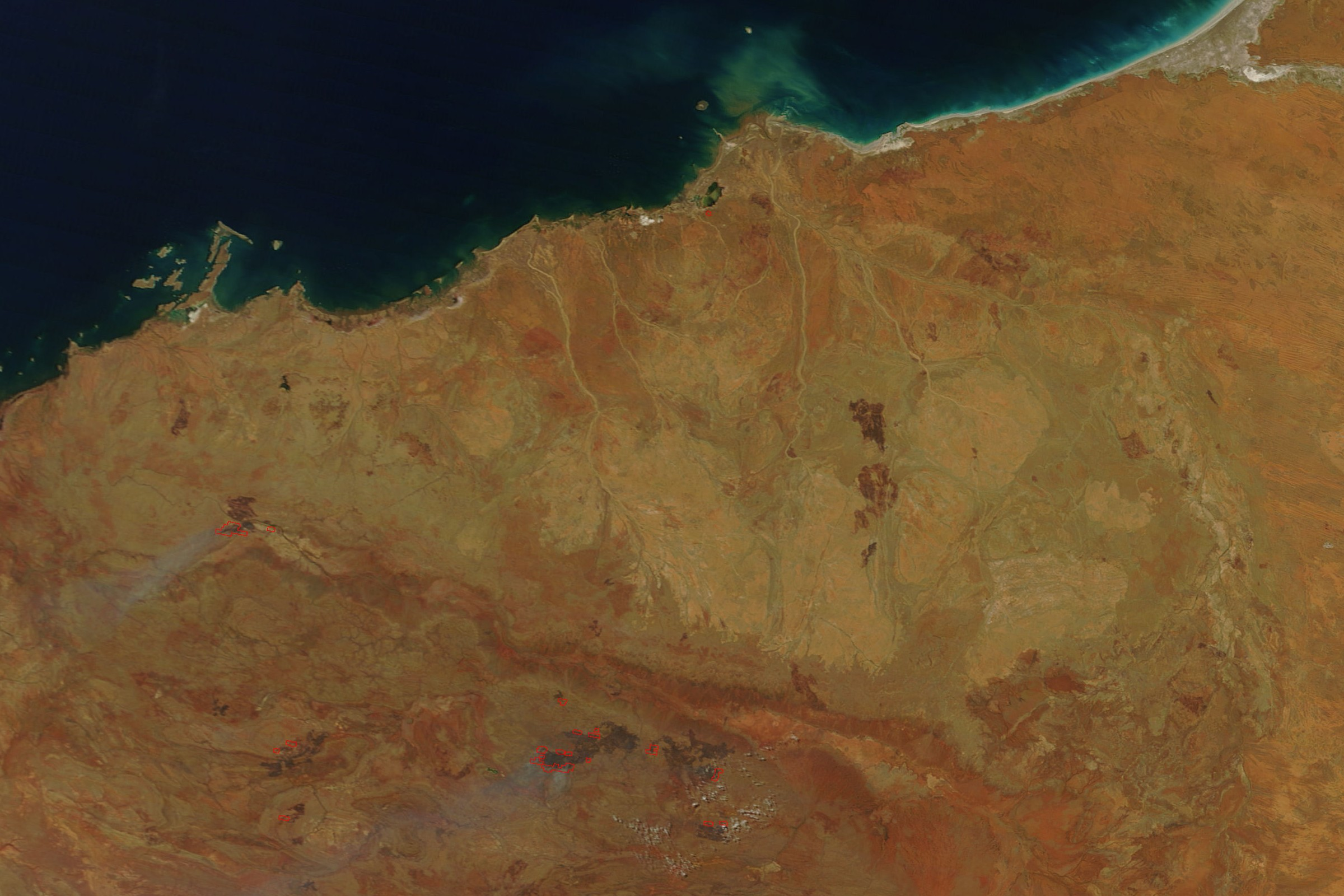
- Satellite view in 2013 of Pilbara Craton
- Type: Geological formation
- Area: Estimated 250,000 km^{2} (97,000 sq mi), Pilbara IRBA v7 region 178,231.26 km^{2} (68,815.47 sq mi)
- Thickness: up to 20 km (12 mi)

Lithology
- Primary: Granite
- Other: Greenstone

Location
- Region: Western Australia
- Country: Australia

Type section
- Named for: Pilbara
- Named by: See Pilbara#Etymology
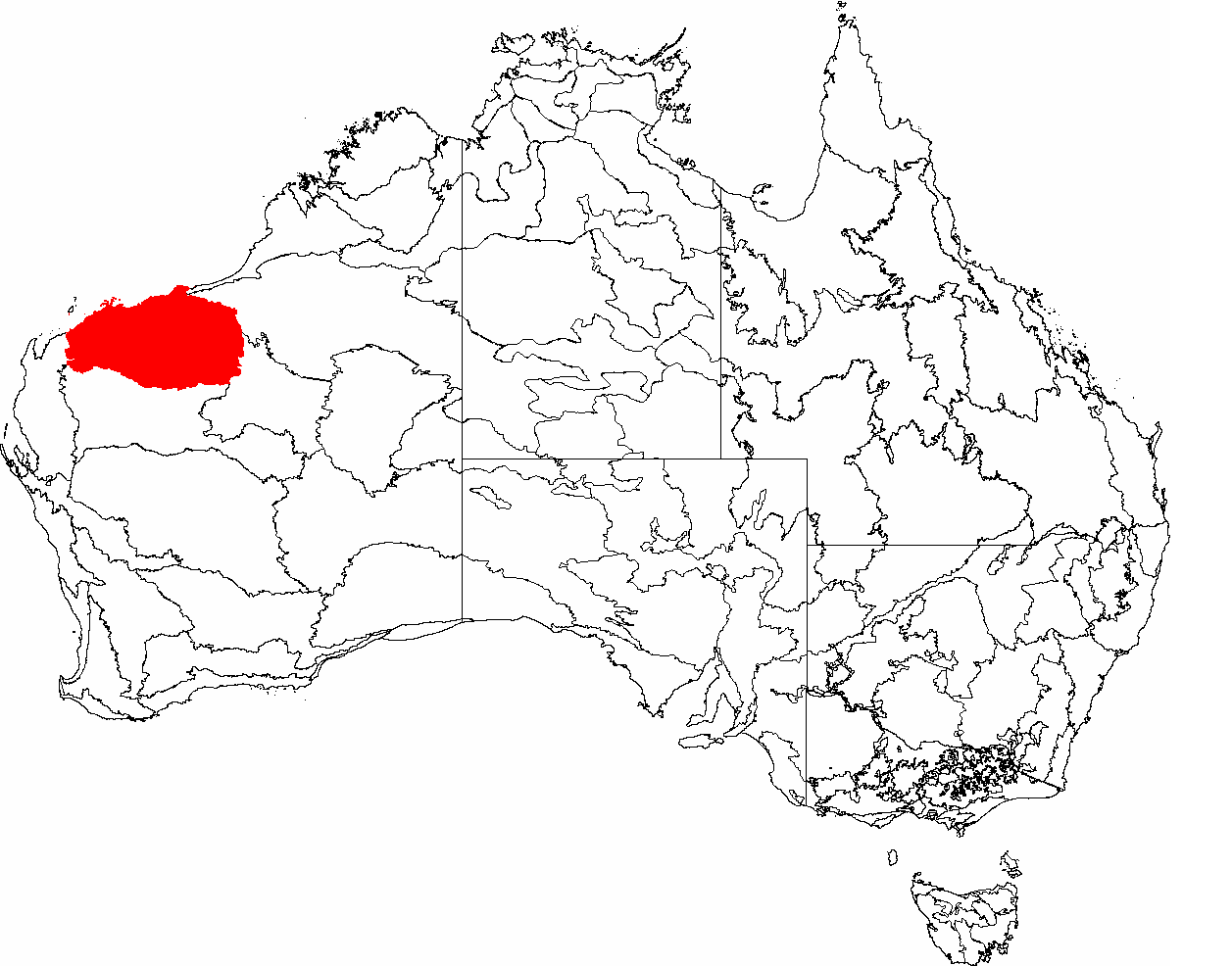
- Map of Australia with the Pilbara region highlighted in red.

Pilbara Craton part of the continental lithosphere using version 7 of IBRA classification. The geo-ecosystems of the PIL02(Fortescue) area in particular are usually on much younger exposed rock formations (< 1.7 Ga) than the lithology discussed in this article.

The Pilbara Craton is an old and stable part of the continental lithosphere located in the Pilbara region of Western Australia.

The Pilbara Craton is one of only two pristine Archaean 3.8–2.7 Ga (billion years ago) crusts identified on the Earth, along with the Kaapvaal Craton in South Africa. The youngest rocks are 1.7 Ga old in the historic area assigned to the Craton. Both locations may have once been part of the Vaalbara supercontinent or the continent of Ur.

There are two subregional geographical classification regimes used, being:

1. The Interim Biogeographic Regionalisation for Australia based upon interacting geo-ecosystems
2. Based on geology alone where the eastern continuous oldest portion is called the Eastern Pilbara Craton and younger surface lithologies within the larger craton have different names.

The currently exposed continuous Pilbara Craton in red, the Eastern Pilbara region outlined in blue, and detail of local lithologies. However this map does not show other discontinuous exposed oldest rocks of the Pilbara Craton. Accordingly a reader should refer to the references for more detailed geological mapping which is not reproduced here for copyright reasons.

== Geology ==
The most important part of the Pilbara Craton to understand the early Earth crust is called the Eastern Pilbara Craton, where, still exposed today, are crustal rocks that are up to 3.8 billion years old and intrusive granitic domes along with greenstone belts that are about 3.5 to 3.2 billion years old. The geology was reassessed in 2007 with the separation out from the geologically named Pilbara Craton of a thick succession of interbedded clastic or chemical sedimentary rocks and volcanic rocks forming the Fortescue, Hamersley, and Turee Creek basins that are usually aged from 2.78–2.42 billion years old and the younger volcano-sedimentary Ashburton Basin aged from 2.21–1.79 billion years ago. A surface region between the Fortescue and Hamersley basins is even younger, at less than 1.7 billion years old, as are the surrounding geo-ecosystems surface rocks to the Pilbara Craton. To the east and south of the Eastern Pilbara Craton there are significant outcrops of the very old rocks and that these are confined to the traditional area of the Pilbara Craton which is inferred to be subsurface for more than half its area.

=== Impact structures ===
In 2025 the discovery of shatter cones near Marble Bar was announced, confirming the 3.47 billion year old North Pole Dome as the oldest dated impact structure (remnant of an impact crater) in the world.

=== Mineralogy ===
There are extensive high quality iron ore deposits and also economic to mine gold, silver, copper, nickel, lead, zinc, molybdenum, vanadium and fluorite deposits.

== Evidence of earliest life ==
Evidence of the earliest known life on land may have been found in 3.48-billion-year-old geyserite and other related mineral deposits (often found around hot springs and geysers) uncovered in the Dresser Formation in the Pilbara Craton. Biogenic sedimentary structures (microbialites) such as stromatolites and MISS were described from tidal, lagoonal and subtidal coastal settings that can be reconstructed from the Dresser stratigraphy as well. The rocks of the Dresser Formation display evidence of haematite alteration that may have been microbially influenced.

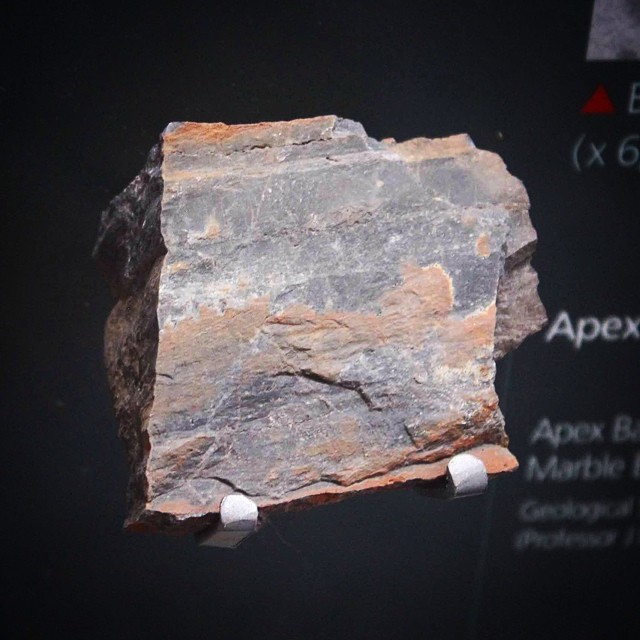
Apex chert

The earliest direct evidence of life on Earth may be fossils of microorganisms permineralized in 3.465-billion-year-old Australian Apex chert rocks. However, the evidence for the biogenicity of these microstructures has been thoroughly debated. Originally, 11 taxa were described from a deposit thought to be located at the mouth of a river due to certain characteristics like rounded and sorted grains. Extensive field mapping and petrogenetic analysis has since shown the setting for the purported microfossils to be hydrothermal and this is widely supported. Consequently, many alternative abiotic explanations have been proposed for the filamentous microstructures including carbonaceous rims around quartz spherules and rhombs, witherite self-assembled biomorphs and haematite infilled veinlets. The carbonaceous matter composing the filaments has also been repeatedly examined with Raman spectroscopy which has yielded mixed interpretations of results and is therefore regarded by many to be unreliable for determining biogenicity when used alone. Perhaps the most compelling argument to date is based on high spatial resolution electron microscopy like scanning and transmission electron microscopy. This study concludes that the nano-scale morphology of the filaments and the distribution of the carbonaceous matter are inconsistent with a biological origin for the filaments. Instead, it is more likely that the hydrothermal conditions have assisted in the heating, hydration and exfoliation of potassium micas on which barium, iron and carbonate have secondarily been adsorbed.

Carbonaceous structures appearing to be of biological origin have also been discovered in the 3.47 billion year-old Mount Ada Basalt, a rock layer that is a few million years older than the Apex chert. However, the biogenicity of these supposed fossils has also been disputed, with some studies finding abiotic processes to be a more likely culprit for their formation.

Additional potential bioindicators from the Precambrian have been found in the region, including carbonaceous microfossils in the northeastern Pilbara Craton.

== See also ==
- Archaea
- Australian Shield
- Centralian Superbasin
- Gawler Craton
- Geology of Australia
- Ore genesis
- Perth Basin
- Western Plateau
- Yilgarn Craton

== Bibliography ==
- Kato, Y.; Nakamura, K. (2003). "Origin and global tectonic significance of Early Archean cherts from the Marble Bar greenstone belt, Pilbara Craton, Western Australia". Precambrian Research. 125 (3–4): 191–243. Bibcode:2003PreR..125..191K. doi:10.1016/S0301-9268(03)00043-3.
- Oliver, N. H. S.; Cawood, P.A (2001). "Early tectonic dewatering and brecciation on the overturned sequence at Marble Bar, Pilbara Craton, Western Australia: dome-related or not?". Precambrian Research. 105 (1): 1–15. Bibcode:2001PreR..105....1O. doi:10.1016/S0301-9268(00)00098-X.
- Terabayashi, M.; Masada, Y.; Ozawa, H. (2003). "Archean ocean-floor metamorphism in the North Pole area, Pilbara Craton, Western Australia". Precambrian Research. 127 (1–3): 167–180. Bibcode:2003PreR..127..167T. doi:10.1016/S0301-9268(03)00186-4.
- Zegers, E.; de Wit, M. J.; Dann, J.; White, S. H. (1998). "Vaalbara, Earth's oldest assembled continent? A combined structural, geochronological, and palaeomagnetic test". Terra Nova. 10 (5): 250–259. Bibcode:1998TeNov..10..250Z. doi:10.1046/j.1365-3121.1998.00199.x. S2CID 52261989.
