= Miralga impact structure =

Impact structure in Western Australia

- Location within Western Australia
- Location: Western Australia, Australia; 21°02′54″S 119°23′35″E

Impact crater structure
- Confidence: Confirmed
- Diameter: 40–45 km (25–28 mi) (current diameter of the North Pole Dome, original study); 16 kilometres (9.9 mi) (July 2025 study)
- Age: 3470 ± 2 Ma (original study) ~2700–400 Ma (July 2025 study) ~3024 Ma (2026 study)
- Exposed: Yes
- Drilled: No

The Miralga impact structure is an impact structure in the Pilbara Craton of Western Australia. With an initially estimated age of around 3.47 billion years dating to the Paleoarchean, it has been suggested to be the oldest known impact structure on Earth by over a billion years and the only one known from the Archean.

The structure is found in the East Pilbara Terrane, one of the oldest parts of the Pilbara Craton. The structure lies on a geological dome called the North Pole Dome which was initially suggested to represent the central uplift of the structure. Evidence of the impact is shatter cones found in the Antarctic Creek Member, a 20-metre-thick (66 ft) layer of sedimentary rock including "felsic to mafic volcaniclastic rocks, chert, argillite, arenite and jaspilite intruded by dolerite", sandwiched between overlying and underlying volcanic rocks of the Mount Ada Basalt Basalt, which is 2–3 kilometres (1.2–1.9 mi) thick.

In the original March 2025 study describing the structure, uranium–lead dating of detrital zircons within the Antarctic Creek Member, as well as separate dating of the overlying and underlying volcanic strata, suggested that the age of the Antarctic Creek Member, and thus the impact, dates to 3470 million years ago, ± 2–3 million years. The 40–45-kilometre (25–28 mi) diameter of the dome led the authors to suggest that the long-since-eroded impact crater was over 100 kilometres (62 mi) in diameter when it formed.

A study published several months later in July 2025 disputed the conclusions made in the original study. While they agreed that an impact structure existed (which they dubbed the Miralga impact structure), they found that shatter cones existed in much-younger overlying rocks dating to 2.71 billion years ago, so the impact must have occurred after that time, and based on other constraints, the impact must have also occurred sometime before 400 million years ago. They also found that the formation of the North Pole Dome must have predated the formation of the structure, and that the impact structure was smaller than initially suggested, only 16 kilometres (9.9 mi) in diameter.

A subsequent study published in June 2026, by the same team of authors as the original March 2025 study, challenged the conclusions of the July 2025 paper, arguing that the rocks cited as evidence for a post-2.71-billion-year impact had not been independently dated. Using integrated zircon, apatite, and muscovite geochronology from the shatter-cone-bearing rocks themselves, the authors found that skeletal zircon recrystallized during impact-related thermal-fluid activity yields an age of 3.024 billion years, corroborated by an independent hydrothermal apatite age of 3.019 billion years from a separate sample. Undeformed muscovite in a vein cross-cutting the shatter-cone fabric dates to 1.655 billion years ago, establishing a firm minimum age for the impact and ruling out any younger event as the cause. The authors concluded that no known regional geological event between 3.4 and 3.0 billion years ago can otherwise account for the observed zircon recrystallization, and that the North Pole Dome structure therefore predates the Brenner et al. maximum age constraint. If correct, this would restore the structure's status as Earth's oldest-known and only confirmed Archean impact crater.

Spherules formed from condensed impact vapour within the Antarctic Creek Member do record unambiguous evidence of an approximately 3.5-billion-year-old impact event within the rocks of the North Pole Dome, but spherules can be transported long distances away from the impact site, so it does not represent clear evidence of a nearby impact. This may represent the same impact event as a similarly-aged spherule bed found in the Barberton Greenstone Belt of South Africa.

== See also ==
- Dresser Formation – a Paleoarchean geological formation that forms part of the strata of the North Pole Dome, containing some of the oldest known evidence of life on Earth

== See also ==
- List of impact craters on Earth
- Impact crater
