= Quartz diorite =

Igneous, plutonic rock

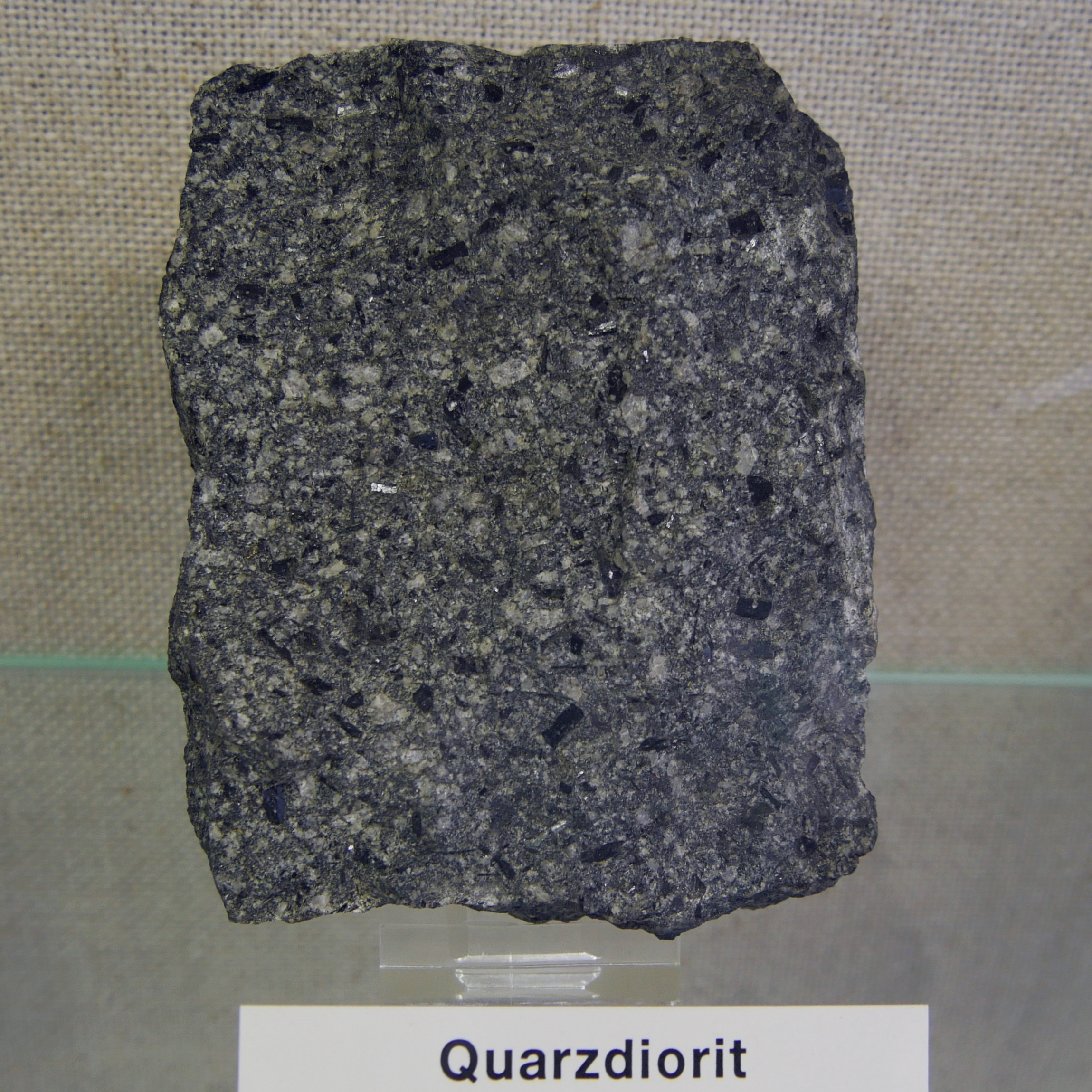
Quartz diorite from Verneuge, Puy-de-Dôme, France

Quartz diorite is an igneous, plutonic (intrusive) rock, of felsic composition, with phaneritic texture. Feldspar is present as plagioclase (typically oligoclase or andesine) with 10% or less potassium feldspar. Quartz is present at between 5 and 20% of the rock. Biotite, amphiboles and pyroxenes are common dark accessory minerals.

Quartz diorite occurs in association with other granitic rocks such as granodiorite, and with volcanic rock. In western North America a "quartz diorite line" occurs; west of this line, the dominant granitic rock is quartz diorite.

== See also ==
- Tonalite – Igneous rock
