= Heat-pipe tectonics =

Heat-pipe tectonics is a cooling mode of terrestrial planets and moons in which the main heat transport mechanism in the planet is volcanism through the outer hard shell, also called the lithosphere. Heat-pipe tectonics initiates when volcanism becomes the dominant surface heat transfer process. Melted rocks and other more volatile planetary materials are transferred from the mantle to surface via localised vents. Melts cool down and solidify forming layers of cool volcanic materials. Newly erupted materials deposit on top of and bury older layers. The accumulation of volcanic layers on the shell and the corresponding evacuation of materials at depth cause the downward transfer of superficial materials such that the shell materials continuously descend toward the planet's interior.

Heat-pipe tectonics was first introduced based on the observations on Io, one of the moons of Jupiter. Io is a rocky body that is internally extremely hot; its heat is produced by tidal flexing associated with its eccentric orbit. It releases internal heat via frequent and extensive volcanic eruptions that transfer melts to the surface. Its crust is a single thick, dense and cold outer shell made up of layers of volcanic materials, whose rigidity and strength supports the weight of high mountains.

Observations suggest that similar processes occurred in the early history of other terrestrial planets in the Solar System, i.e. Venus, the Moon, Mars, Mercury and Earth, indicating they may preserve fossil heat-pipe evidence. Every terrestrial body in the Solar System might have had heat-pipe tectonics at some point; heat-pipe tectonics may thus be a universal early cooling mode of terrestrial bodies.

== Theory ==
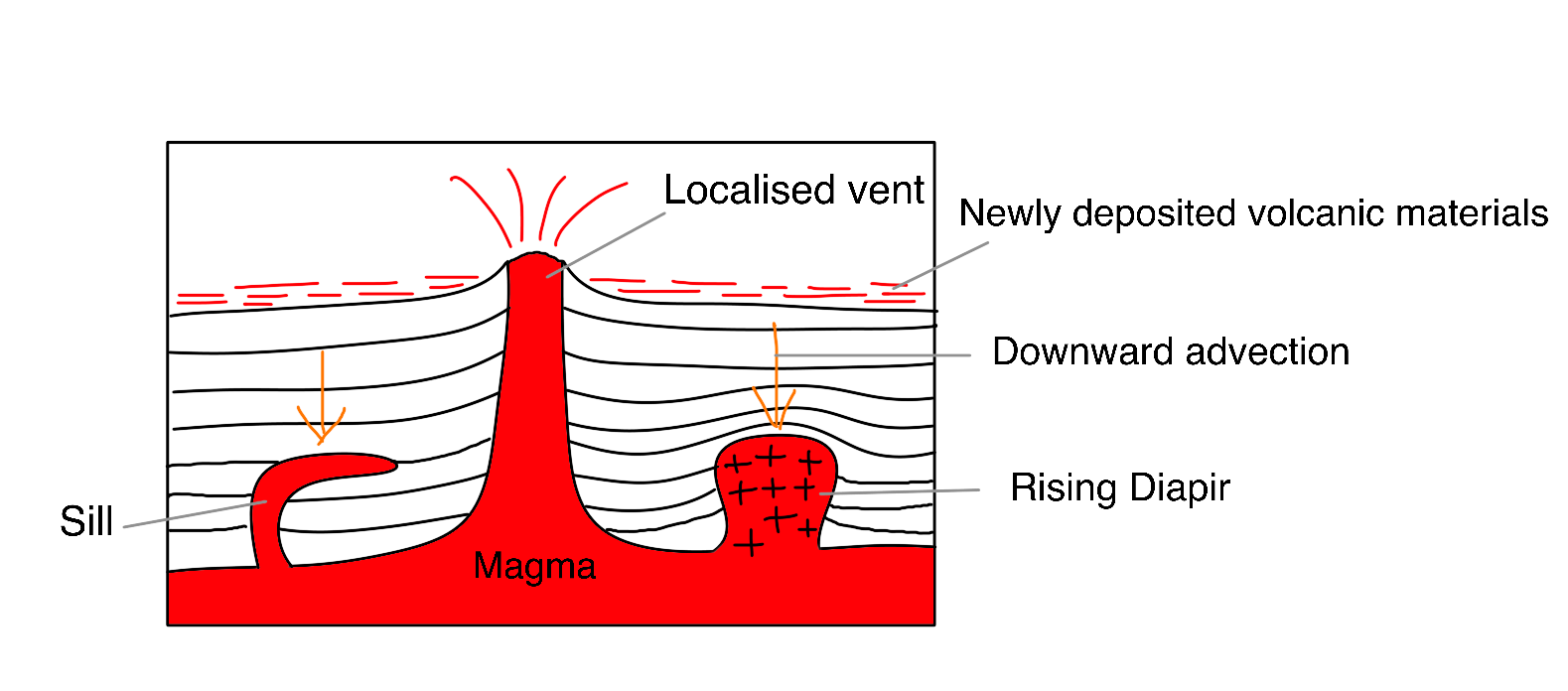
Figure 1: Volcanic Resurfacing. Melts rise through vent reaching the surface and forms layers of volcanic materials constantly. As such, the newly deposited materials bury the older layers, pushing the older layers downwards. Besides, intrusions, e.g. diapir or sill, may occur at the bottom of the lithosphere.

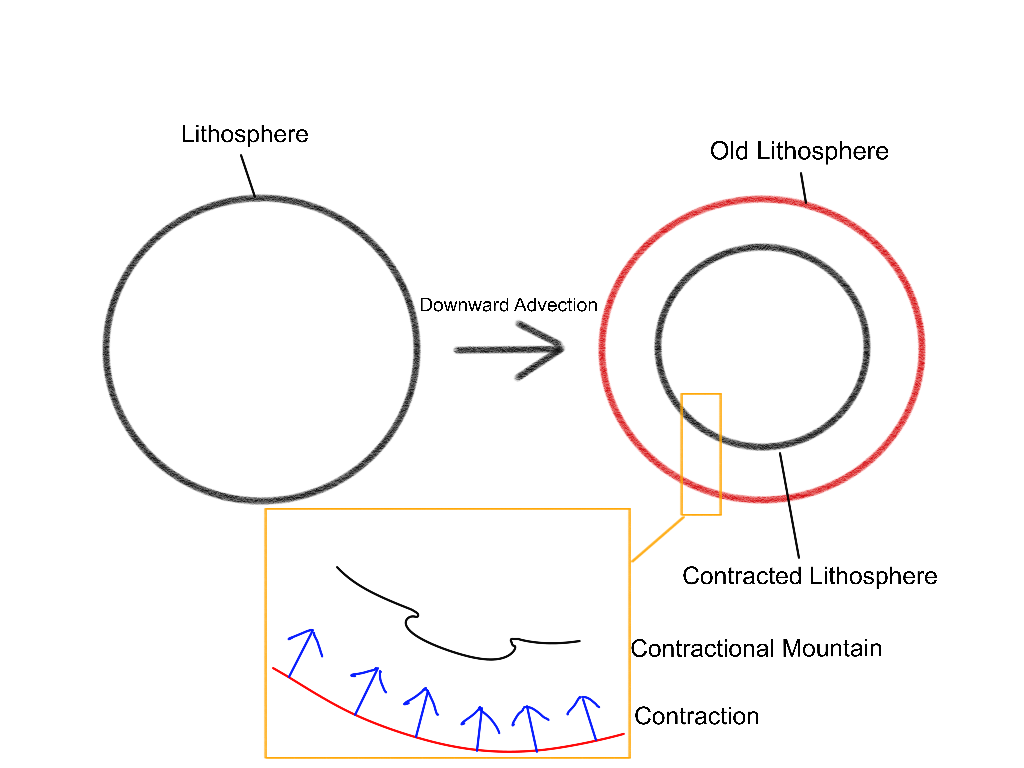
Figure 2: Contractional Mountain. Downward advection of volcanic layers occurs under ongoing volcanic resurfacing. As the older layer is compressed to a smaller sphere, contraction occurs on the layer causing shortening, either in form of fault or fold.

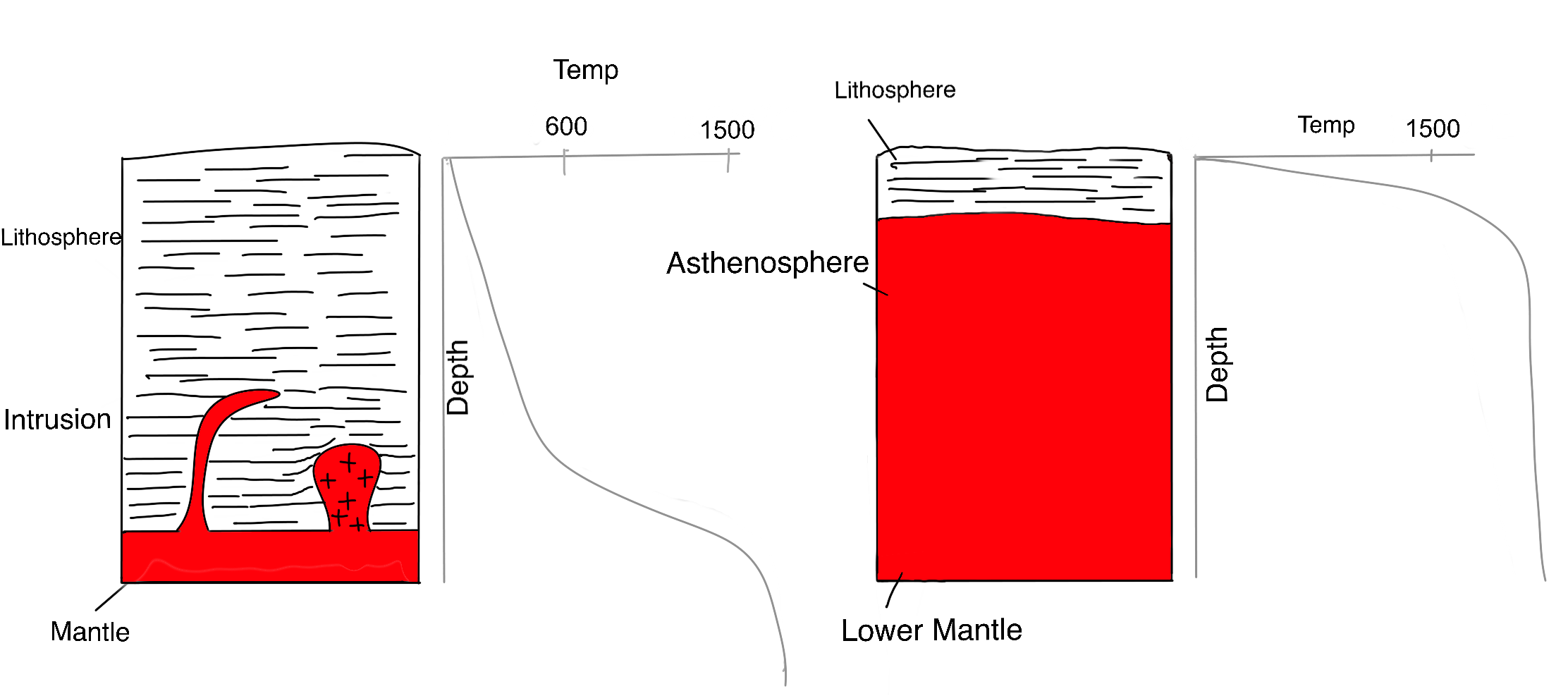
Left: Heat-pipe tectonics develops a thicker and colder lithosphere by repetitive volcanic resurfacing. The lithosphere remains at low temperature, i.e. 600 degree Celsius, in great depth. Right: Plate tectonics develops a thinner and hotter lithosphere that it raises to 1500 degree Celsius at shallow depth. (Modified from Moore & Webb, 2013; Arevalo, McDonough & Luong, 2009)

In heat-pipe tectonics, volcanism is the major heat transport mechanism in which melts of rock are transferred to the surface by localised vents. Advection, referring to the transfer of mass and heat, occurs when a moving fluid carries substances or heat to or away from a source and through a surrounding solid along channels. Melts are produced when mantle rocks bear temperatures between 1100 and 2400 °C at corresponding depths (pressure varies the melting temperature) with the presence of water. When melts reach surface via vertical vents, they cool down and solidify forming mafic or ultramafic rocks which are rich in iron and magnesium. A thicker lithosphere is formed when volcanic materials accumulate on the Earth’s surface via repetitive volcanic eruptions. The new materials at the top, with the corresponding void created in the planet interior, lead to the sinking of superficial deposits.

This vertical advection of volcanic materials causes compression of the lithosphere, because interior spherical shells of planets are progressively becoming smaller at increasing depths. The surface cools down and a cold, dense and strong lithosphere is developed. The thick lithosphere supports the mountains that result from the contraction of volcanic layers.

Cooling heat-pipe planets could enter the next stage of cooling history, either lid tectonics or plate tectonics, immediately from the heat-pipe stage after prolonged cooling.

== Inspiration from Io ==
Io, a moon of Jupiter, is a small terrestrial planet, its radius is 1821.6±0.5 km, with a size similar to the Moon's. Yet, Io produces a much higher heat flow, 60~160 terawatts (TW), which is 40 times larger than that on Earth. Radioactive decay cannot generate this large amount of heat. Radioactive decay supplies heating on other terrestrial planets. Instead, tidal-generated heat is a better hypothesis as Io is under great tidal influence imposed by Jupiter and other large moons of Jupiter, similar to the Earth and the Moon.

The first observation supporting this was the active volcanism found on Io. There are over 100 calderas with abundant and widely spread radiating lava flows. And the composition of the lava is interpreted to be mainly sulfur and silicates from the high eruption temperature of at least 1200 K.

In addition to extensive volcanism, mountain ranges are the second observation on Io's surface. Io has 100~150 mountains with mean height of 6 km and a maximum height of 17 km. Mountains found have no tectonic evidence of their origin. Neither are there volcanoes in the mountainous areas.

A hypothesis of the development of thick lithosphere is built on these observations. The old theory suggested any terrestrial planets have a thin lithosphere. However, a thin 5-km-thick lithosphere cannot withstand the large stress of 6 kbar exerted by a 10 km×10 km mountain. To compare, the maximum stress that the lithosphere of the Earth can withstand is 2 kbar. Thus, Io requires a thicker lithosphere to bear the overwhelming stresses imposed by globally distributed mountains.

Heat-pipe tectonics was then introduced to explain the situation on Io. The theory explains the globally distributed volcanic materials on the surface; the development of thick lithosphere; and the formation of contractional mountains.

== Fossil heat-pipes in other terrestrial planets in the Solar System ==
Research in 2017 suggested that all terrestrial planets may possibly undergo volcanism to cool down in their early development when they were much hotter inside than at present. In the Solar System, Mars, the Moon, Mercury, Venus and Earth show evidence of past heat pipe tectonics, while not undergoing it at present.

	Evidence	Explanation
Mercury	Lobate scarps record limited lithospheric contraction.; Large scale volcanism dominated the heat transfer mechanism until 4 billion years ago, smoothing out the surface.; No volcano can be found, but evidence of volcanism covers an extensive area.; Lava spilling out through the vent can flow easily over a large area, matching the mafic composition.	Little earlier structure and shape of the planet can be preserved under continuous volcanic resurfacing.; Structures and special landscapes can only be preserved after heat-pipe tectonics terminates. This explains the limited contraction.; Mafic volcanic materials and its formation match with the hypothesis of heat-pipe tectonics.
Moon	The shape of the Moon is not a perfect circle, but a slightly flattened circle.	The changes in shape must be recorded and preserved, but only in a strong and thick lithosphere. Heat-pipe tectonics develops a strong and thick lithosphere quickly so that the shape could be preserved.
Mars	The Martian dichotomy: great topographical contrast between the depression in the Martian northern hemisphere and the elevated southern hemisphere.; Wide isotopic range of neodymium (Nd), i.e. four times of that on Earth.	Heat-pipe tectonics produces a thick and strong lithosphere which could preserve the older shape and topographies.; The first shell on Mars is formed by an immediate accumulation of the incompatible elements, such as neodymium.
Venus	Structures in Ovda Regio, a high plain, show vertical advection of superficial materials.	Downward advection of surficial materials and the formation of the thick lithosphere in the high plain match with the heat-pipe tectonics.

=== Heat-pipe Earth ===
A hypothesis has been introduced to the early Earth that the Earth followed heat-pipe tectonics theory and cooled down through volcanism. From 4.5 billion years ago, the earth started cooling until 3.2 billion years ago when plate tectonics started. The age of plate tectonics initiation is verified by several pieces of evidence such as Wilson Cycle.

==== Existing theories and constraints ====
Two major existing theories explain early Earth tectonics, namely proto-plate tectonics and vertical tectonics.

Previous Theories	Motion	Example
Proto-plate tectonics	Horizontal	Compressional; Extensional
Vertical Tectonics	Vertical	Sub/intra-lithospheric inverse-drip shaped intrusion; Subduction; Volcanism

New observations in Barberton, South Africa and Pilbara, Australia show no evidence of periods of non-diapiric deformation that lasted more than 300 million years. Applying the existing theories to explain the deformation, upward inverse-drip shaped intrusion of melts is the solution. In this case, horizontal motions must be involved. Yet, no proof of horizontal motion could be found. Based on this, some researchers applied heat-pipe tectonics to the early Earth.

==== Heat-pipe evidence ====
Place	Observations	Heat-pipe Hypothesis
Barberton and Pilbara	Thick sequenced volcanic materials (rich in iron and magnesium), i.e. 12-km thick, in Pilbara.; Upward inverse-drip shaped intrusion metamorphose the volcanic layers into TTG (Tonalite - trondhjemite - granodiorite).; Dome-shaped structures resulted from the intrusion.; No deformational structure found until 3.2 billion years ago.; Tectonism-induced structure found right after 3.2 billion years ago: Pilbara: Rifting and arc production Barberton: Collisions and intrusion.	Constant volcanic eruption through localised vents creates thick lithosphere (rich in iron and magnesium).; No tectonism until 3.2 billion years ago.; Intrusions occur at the base of the lithosphere.
Itsaq	Most rocks older than 3.2 billion years ago are gneiss (4.03 billion years ago).; Some deformations were found earlier than 3.2 billion years.	Planets cool down over time in heat-pipe tectonics.; Subduction could explain the deformation, as planets should cool down after subduction. But the process is slow and progressive, which takes a long period to cool down after subduction events.; Yet, no tectonic evidence can prove the occurrence of subduction.; Long-existing reverse faults with overlapping pattern (Duplex) is a better explanation. It does not involve any subduction and thus no cooling after any processes.; A sharp decline in heat-pipe tectonics after 3.2 billion years ago.

== Beyond heat-pipe tectonics ==
As time goes by, terrestrial planets cool down as internal heat production reduces and the surface temperature becomes lower. On top of that, the major heat transfer process is changing towards conduction. Thus, an abrupt transition from heat-pipe tectonics to either plate tectonics or stagnant lid tectonics occurs when conduction heat is larger than the internal heat production.

Stagnant lid refers to the relatively stable and immobile strong cold lithosphere with little horizontal movements, while plate tectonics, refers to the mobile lithosphere with many horizontal movements.

In the plate tectonic stage, the plate starts breaking up when convective stresses driven by the mantle overcome lithospheric strength. As volcanism is no longer the dominant heat transfer method, much less volcanic material would be deposited globally. A thinner lithosphere is then developed with increasing lithospheric temperature gradient, i.e. 1500 degree Celsius at 100-km depth).
