= Dresser Formation =

Geologic formation in Western Australia

- Stratigraphic range: Paleoarchaen; 3483–3479 Ma
- Type: Geological formation
- Unit of: Warrawoona Group
- Sub-units: two bedded chert horizons separated by pillow basalt
- Underlies: Mount Ada Basalt
- Overlies: North Star Basalt
- Area: limited to Panorama greenstone belt surrounding North Pole Dome of Pilbara Craton

Lithology
- Primary: bedded chert, volcaniclastic sandstone, felsic tuff, conglomerate, breccia, and jaspilitic chert
- Other: basalt

Location
- Coordinates: 21.151759°S 119.437252°E
- Region: Western Australia
- Country: Australia
- Extent: 25 km^{2} (9.7 sq mi)

Type section
- Named for: Dresser Mine
- Named by: M. J. Van Kranendonk
- Location: Dresser Mine
- Year defined: 2000
- Region: Western Australia
- Country: Australia

The Dresser Formation is a Paleoarchean geologic formation that outcrops as a generally circular ring of hills in the North Pole Dome area of the East Pilbara Terrane of the Pilbara Craton of Western Australia. This formation is one of many formations that comprise the Warrawoona Group, which is the lowermost of four groups that comprise the Pilbara Supergroup. The Dresser Formation is part of the Panorama greenstone belt that surrounds and outcrops around the intrusive North Pole Monzogranite. Dresser Formation consists of metamorphosed, blue, black, and white bedded chert; pillow basalt; carbonate rocks; minor felsic volcaniclastic sandstone and conglomerate; hydrothermal barite; evaporites; and stromatolites. The lowermost of three stratigraphic units that comprise the Dresser Formation contains some of the Earth's earliest commonly accepted evidence of life such as morphologically diverse stromatolites, microbially induced sedimentary structures, putative organic microfossils, and biologically fractionated carbon and sulfur isotopic data.

== Nomenclature ==
Initially, the three major stratigraphic units containing bedded chert found within the Warrawoona Group were correlated as one stratigraphic unit across the various greenstone belts that occur in the East Pilbara Terrane. This formation was named the Towers Formation after the type of area near the town of Marble Bar.

With subsequent and more detailed geological mapping and geochronologic studies, geologists found that the major bedded cherts of the Towers formation belonged to one of three different and distinct stratigraphic units. The oldest of these bedded cherts are the stromatolitic bedded chert-barites of the Dresser Formation in the Panorama greenstone belt. The second oldest are the slightly younger Marble Bar Chert Member of the Towers Formation in the Marble Bar greenstone belt. The youngest of these three bedded cherts is the Strelley Pool Chert, a stromatolitic unit that occurs in several of the greenstone belts of the East Pilbara. With time and additional research, the assigned stratigraphic position of these and other stratigraphic units within the Pilbara Supergroup have changed and been rearranged numerous times

== Description ==
The Dresser Formation consists primarily of komatiitic basalt transected by silica-rich veins; fossiliferous, interbedded chert and barite; and pillow basalt with interbedded chert and diabase. These lithologies are three mappable, member-scale stratigraphic units. The lowermost member, often informally called the North Pole chert, consists of hydrothermally altered, bedded chert, stromatolites, and volcanoclastic sedimentary rocks, with abundant barite. The middle member consists of metamorphosed pillow and massive basalt. The upper member, which lacks barite, consists of unfossiliferous, bedded gray and white chert and local interbeds of volcanoclastic sedimentary rocks. Previously, the unnamed upper member was subdivided into as many as three individual subunits separated by interbedded basalt. However, detailed mapping has shown that these chert subunits all belong to a single member that has been separated by younger, dolerite, and felsic sills at significant period of time after deep burial.

=== North Pole chert ===
The thickness and lithology of the North Pole chert, the basal member of the Dresser Formation, vary greatly over short distances. Rapid lateral facies variations and sedimentary thickness changes take place over short distances (50 to 1,000 m (160 to 3,280 ft)), along-strike due to growth faults filled by hydrothermal chert-barite veins. The thickness of the North Pole chert varies from a minimum of 1–2 m (3.3–6.6 ft) to a maximum of 208 m (682 ft). The North Pole chert is the only fossil-bearing unit of the Dresser Formation

The North Pole chert consists of four main facies. Facies 1 typically forms the base of the North Pole chert and varies from 0 to 20 meters (0 to 66 ft) thick. It consists of mixture of cross-bedded sandstones, massive sandstone, silicified mudstone, and volcaniclastic conglomerate, and breccia. The volcaniclastic conglomerates locally contain gravel-size clasts of bedded jaspilitic chert, coarse crystalline barite, and stromatolitic laminates. These gravels are surrounded by felsic tuffaceous matrix.

Facies 2, which overlies facies 1, contains widespread stromatolite layers, putative hot spring deposits, and a variety of other distinctive rock types. For example, a widespread layer, up to 1 m (3.3 ft) thick, of rhythmically bedded carbonate-chert, called zebra rock, occurs near the base of facies 2. The bed of zebra rock often grades upward into a 20 cm (7.9 in) thick bed of rippled and cross-laminated carbonate sandstone that exhibits well-defined linear, to bifurcating, ripple crests. This cross-laminated sandstone also contains evaporative aragonite crystal splays. This cross-laminated sandstone is, in turn, overlain by a thick laterally extensive bed of wrinkly laminated microbial mats with domical and coniform stromatolites. A variety of lithologies, including local, channel-shaped beds of cobble conglomerate and edgewise conglomerate, overlie the stromatolite bed. Finally, facies 2 contains thick sections of interlayered gray and white chert. Beds of coarse breccia up to 3 m (9.8 ft) thick and with clasts up to 30 cm (12 in) in diameter, occur locally interbedded with the cherts. Angular to subrounded cobbles and boulders of wrinkly stromatolitic laminates, barite, and bedded chert occur in these breccias. Discontinuous, thin beds of well-rounded, unlaminated white chert cobble conglomerate occur interbedded with the gray and white chert.

Facies 3, which overlies facies 2, consists largely of centimeter-layered chert. The layered chert consists of white-gray layered chert and hematitic chert or jaspilite. Barite veins locally cut across the layered cherts. The jaspilitic chert is typically laminated and lacks any evidence of being reworked by currents. Drill cores from beneath the zone of surficial weathering demonstrate that some of the gray and white layered chert of this assemblage are the silicified equivalents of laminated carbonate, a mixture of ankerite, siderite, and calcite. The thickness of facies 3 is not published.

Facies 4 is a 0–100 m (0–328 ft) thick, fining-up sequence of green volcaniclastic conglomerate, sandstone, and chert that unconformably overlies the lower facies. It consists mainly of clasts of komatiitic basalt and basalt. Facies 4 is preserved in sedimentary wedges that thicken southward against bounding growth faults.

=== Middle basalt member ===
The basaltic rocks of the middle basalt member overlie the deposits of facies 4 of the North Pole chert. A basal layer of pillow basalt directly overlies the North Pole chert throughout the northern part of the North Pole Dome and is absent in the south. A homogeneous, massive, fine-to-medium-grained basalt overlies the pillow basalts with an apparently conformable contact. This homogeneous basalt pinches out against listric growth faults that bound either side of the Dresser Mine. It locally contains large blocks of barite and jaspilitic-bearing sedimentary strata.

=== Upper chert member ===
The upper chert member, which is the uppermost member of the Dresser Formation, consists of centimeter-layered white-and-blue to black layered chert. It lacks the heterogeneity of the underlying North Pole chert, remains the same relative thickness along strike, and is not offset by the growth faults that affect the underlying members. The upper chert member is up to 35 m (115 ft) thick. This layered chert lacks any current indicators and is sandwiched between pillow basalts. The upper chert member also has been split apart by younger dolerite and felsic sills.

== Contacts ==
The Dresser Formation lies conformably on the North Star Basalt. In the North Pole Dome region (Panorama greenstone belt) this formation is at least 2 km (1.2 mi) and composed of weakly metamorphosed massive and pillow basalt, komatiitic basalt, basaltic hyaloclastite, gabbro, and dolerite.

A dense network of large chert-barite-pyrite-epithermal quartz hydrothermal veins that cut through the North Star Basalt immediately underlying the Dresser Formation. These veins extend up to the base of and terminate within facies 1 and 2; to a lesser degree in facies 3; and not in facies 4 of the North Pole chert. The largest veins occupy major, long-lived listric growth faults. The main veins extend as much as 2 km (1.2 mi) into the North Star Basalt beneath the base of the Dresser Formation and form swarms as much as 300 m (980 ft) wide. Typically, these veins are only 1 km (0.62 mi) deep and 2–10 m (6.6–32.8 ft) wide.

The Dresser Formation is overlain disconformably by the Mount Ada Basalt. This formation is about 2 km (1.2 mi) thick. Morphologically diverse (spheroids and filamentous) carbonaceous microstructures have been reported from a layer of bedded chert within Mount Ada Basalt. However, they have not been confirmed by additional sampling.

== Paleobiology ==
As reviewed by Buntin and Noffke (2021) and VanKranendonk (2019), the Dresser Formation contains an abundance of well-preserved evidence for the existence of microbial life during the Paleoarchean about 3480 Ma. This evidence consists of biolamites and domical, stratiform, and coniform stromatolites; microbially induced sedimentary structures (MISS); microfossils; microbial mat fabrics; and biosignatures. These fossils and biosignatures are preserved within hydrothermal dikes, barite mounds, siliciclastic sediments, and siliceous and ferruginous carbonates of the North Pole chert. The close spatial association between stromatolites and biogenic carbon and sulfur isotopic biosignatures suggest the former presence of hyperthermophilic microbes.

== Age ==
The estimated depositional age of the Dresser Formation is inferred to be between 3483 and 3479 Ma. It is older than the ~3470 Ma Mount Ada Basalt and younger than the ~3490 Ma North Star Basalt. Syngenetic galena from barite in the Dresser Formation was dated at about ~3490 Ma. An interpretation of U–Pb dates of detrital zircons from volcanoclastic sediments of the Dresser Formation concluded that they accumulated between 3481 and 3470 Ma.

== Depositional environment ==
Initially, the Dresser Formation was interpreted as having accumulated in an enclosed, evaporitic marine setting influenced by syndepositional hydrothermal circulation. Later re-evaluations of the Dresser Formation's depositional environments proposed that it accumulated in shallow-water, low-eruptive, caldera lagoon influenced by syndepositional magma-driven, hydrothermal circulation. Both models propose the presence of marine influence during the deposition of the North Pole chert. They both infer that seawater routinely intermixed with hydrothermal fluids within an enclosed body of shallow water, e.g., a lagoon or flooded volcanic caldera, by way of connections with the open ocean. The Dresser Formation stromatolites apparently formed predominantly within these hydrothermally influenced shallow-marine lagoonal conditions, with geological and geochemical evidence indicating that some also formed in close proximity to subaerial (land-based) hot springs.

== Metamorphism ==
The Dresser Formation is weakly metamorphosed having been subjected only to peak temperatures in the greenschist facies range (~150–350 °C). At first, regional mapping studies suggested that this low metamorphic grade was the result of regional prehnite–pumpellyite to greenschist metamorphism caused by the widespread emplacement of granitic rocks such as the intrusive North Pole Monzogranite ~3300 Ma. More recently, it was proposed that the prehnite–pumpellyite to greenschist metamorphism resulted from repeated episodes of hydrothermal circulation within volcanic packages. These volcanic packages were bound above and below by silicified sediments that acted as aquicludes and confined fluid circulation to within the volcanic packages. The effects of hydrothermal alteration in the Dresser Formation and other stratigraphic units throughout the Warrawoona Group and the local preservation of low-temperature hydrothermal products such as hydrothermal kaolinite are well-documented. An amphibolite-facies metamorphic aureole surrounds the North Pole Monzogranite in the core of the dome.

== See also ==
- Geology of Australia
