= Tonalite–trondhjemite–granodiorite =

Intrusive rocks with typical granitic composition

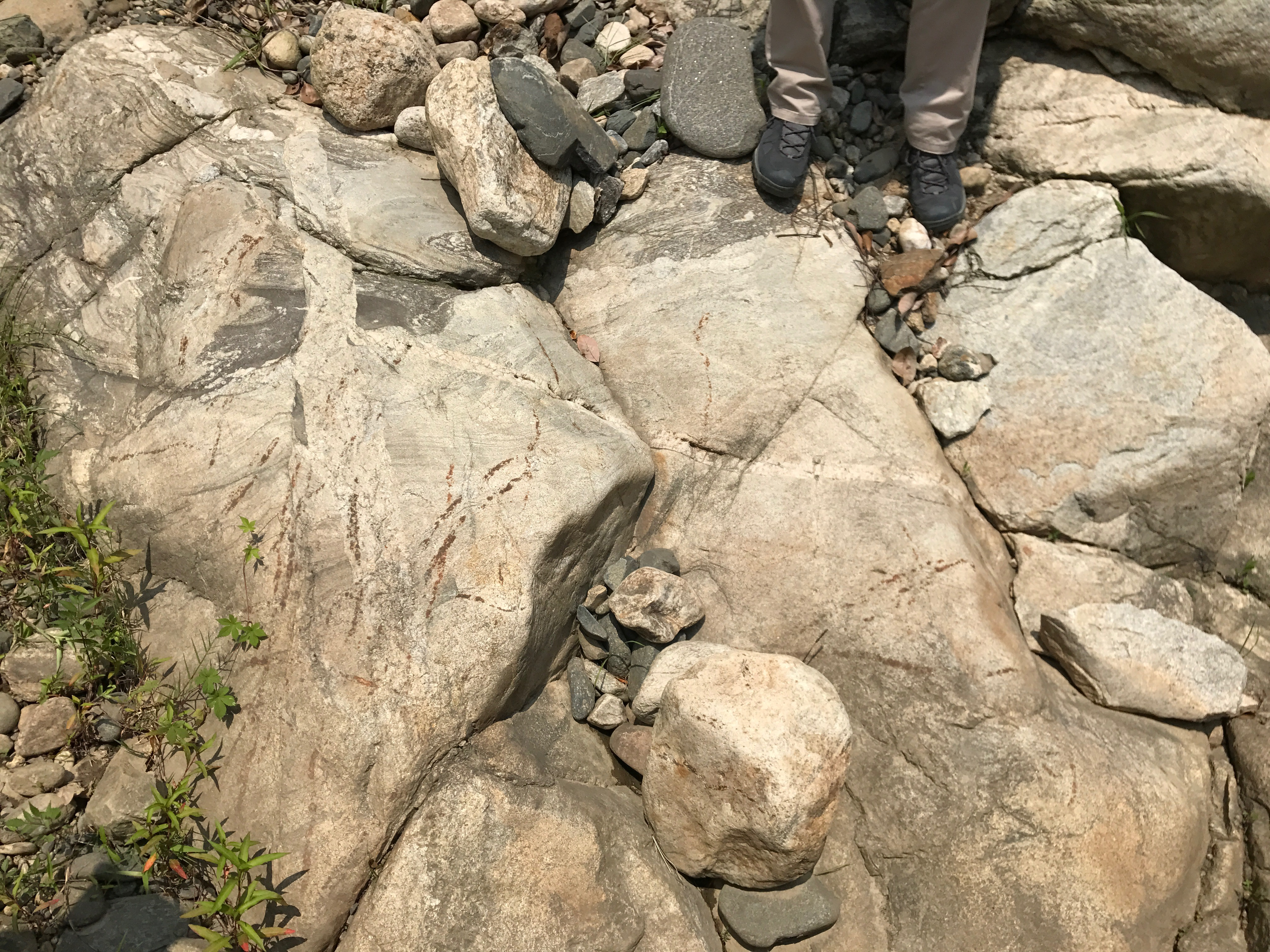
Archean TTG rock outcrop in Kongling Complex, South China Craton. The white TTG rock body is intruded by dark mafic dikes, as well as light color felsic dikes. The mafic minerals in the TTG rock body, possibly biotite, were weathered, which introduced a brownish coating on the TTG rock surface.

Tonalite–trondhjemite–granodiorite (TTG) rocks are intrusive rocks with typical granitic composition (quartz and feldspar) but containing only a small portion of potassium feldspar. Tonalite, trondhjemite, and granodiorite often occur together in geological records, indicating similar petrogenetic processes. Post Archean (after 2.5 Ga) TTG rocks are present in arc-related batholiths, as well as in ophiolites (although of a small proportion), while Archean TTG rocks are major components of Archean cratons.

== Composition ==
The quartz percentage among felsic minerals in TTG rocks is usually larger than 20% but less than 60%. In tonalite and trondhjemite, more than 90% of the feldspars are plagioclase, while in granodiorite, this number is between 65% and 90%. Trondhjemite is a special kind of tonalite, with most of the plagioclase in the rock being oligoclase. The major accessory minerals of TTG rocks include biotite, amphiboles (e.g., hornblende), epidote, and zircon. Geochemically, TTG rocks often have a high silica (SiO_{2}) content (commonly over 70 percent SiO_{2}), high sodium oxide (Na_{2}O) content (with low K_{2}O/Na_{2}O ratio) compared to other plutonic rocks, and low ferromagnesian element content (the weight percentage of iron oxide, magnesium oxide, manganese dioxide, and titanium dioxide added together, commonly smaller than 5%).

== Archean TTG rocks ==
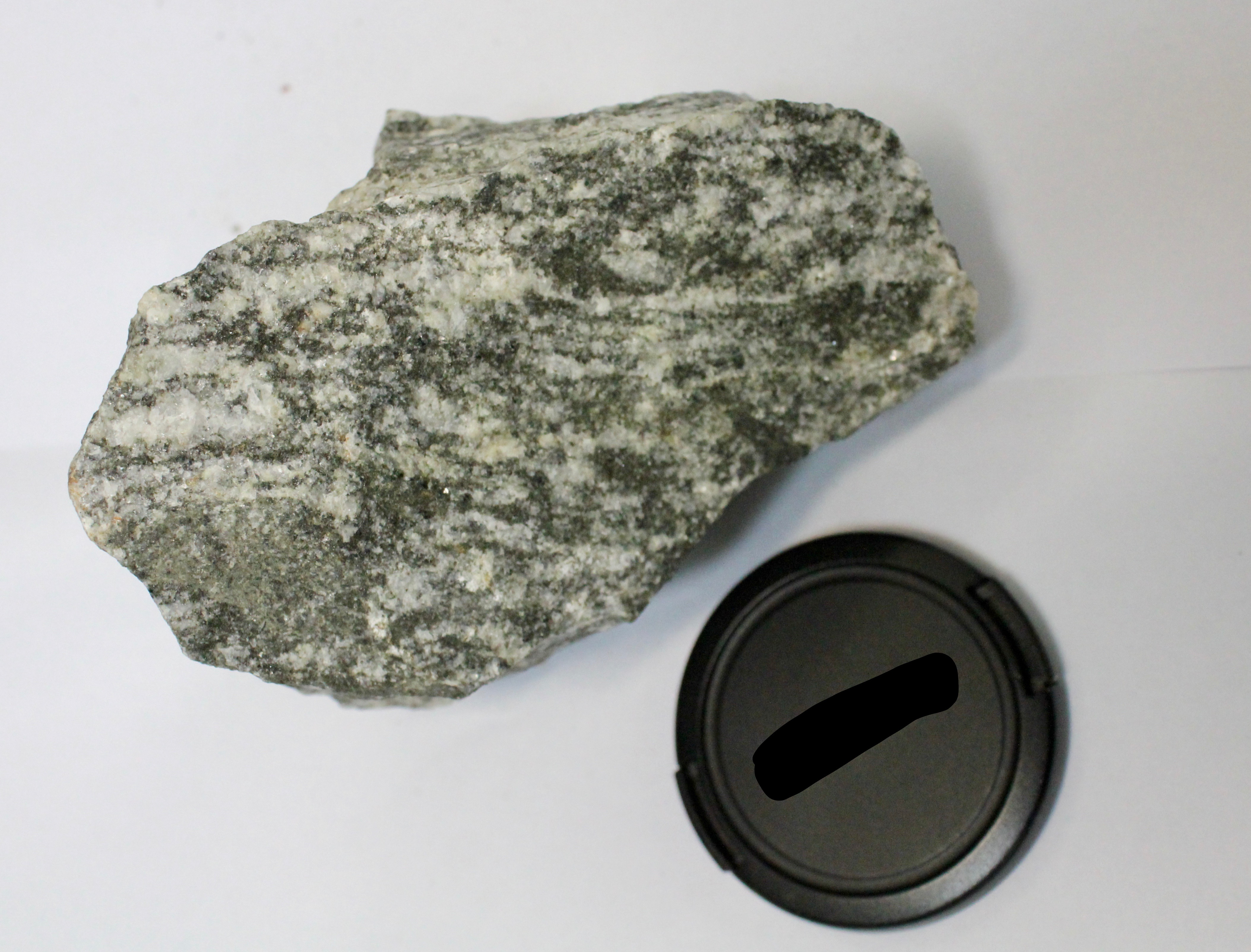
TTG rock sample (Tsawela gneiss) with foliation from the Kaapvaal Craton, South Africa. The white minerals are plagioclase; the light grey ones are quartz; the dark, greenish ones are biotite and hornblende, which developed foliation.

Archean TTG rocks appear to be strongly deformed grey gneiss, showing banding, lineation, and other metamorphic structures, whose protoliths were intrusive rocks. TTG rock is one of the major rock types in Archean cratons.

=== Geochemical features ===
In terms of trace element characteristics, Archean TTGs exhibit high light rare earth element (LREE) content yet low heavy rare earth element (HREE) content. However, they do not show Eu and Sr anomalies. These features indicate the presence of garnet and amphibole, but no plagioclase in the residual phase during partial melting or precipitation phase during fractional crystallization.

=== Formation and classification ===
Confirmed by geochemical modelling, TTG type magma can be generated through partial melting of hydrated meta-mafic rocks. To produce the very low HREE pattern, the melting should be conducted under a garnet-stable pressure-temperature field. Given that garnet stability rises dramatically with increasing pressure, strongly HREE-depleted TTG melts are expected to form under relatively high pressure. Besides the source composition and the pressure, the degree of melting and temperature also influence the melt composition.

Archean TTGs are classified into three groups based on geochemical features, that are low, medium, and high pressure TTGs, although the three groups form a continuous series. The low pressure group shows relatively low Al_{2}O_{3}, Na_{2}O, Sr content and relatively high Y, Yb, Ta, and Nb content, corresponding to melting under 10–12 kbar with the source rock mineral assembly of plagioclase, pyroxene and possibly amphibole or garnet. The high pressure group shows the opposite geochemical features, corresponding to melting at a pressure over 20 kbar, with the source rock containing garnet and rutile but no amphibole or plagioclase. The medium pressure group has transitional features between the other two groups, corresponding to melting under a pressure around 15 kbar with the source rock containing amphibole, much garnet, but little rutile and no plagioclase. Medium pressure TTGs are the most abundant among the three groups.

=== Geodynamic settings ===
The geodynamic setting of the Archean TTG rock generation is currently not well understood. Competing hypotheses include subduction related generation involving plate tectonics and other non-plate tectonic models.

==== Plate tectonic setting ====
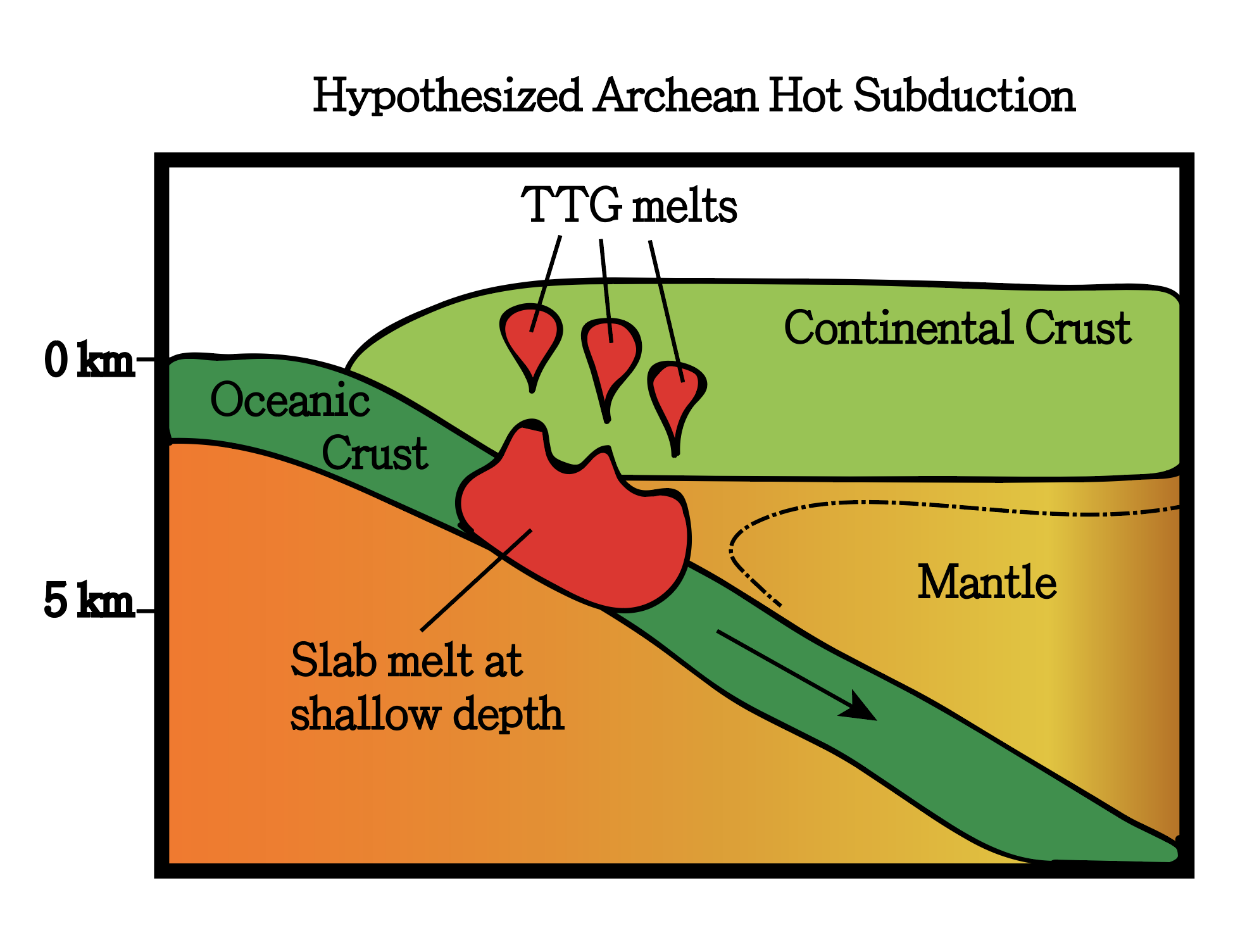
Hypothesized Archean hot subduction induced Archean TTG generation model. The heavier oceanic crust sinks into the lighter mantle. The subducting slab is young and hot, thus when it is heated, it partially melts to generate TTG magmas, which rise and intrude into the continental crust. Light green: continental crust; dark green: oceanic crust; red: TTG melts; orange: mantle. Modified from Moyen & Martin, 2012.

Geochemical similarity shared between TTGs and adakites have long been noted by researchers. Adakites are one type of modern arc lavas, which differ from common arc lavas (mostly granitoids) in their felsic and sodic nature with high LREE but low HREE content. Their production is interpreted to be the partial melting of young and hot subducting oceanic slabs with minor interaction with surrounding mantle wedges, rather than mantle wedge melts like other arc-granitoids. Based on geochemical features (e.g. Mg, Ni, and Cr contents), adakites can be further divided into two groups, namely high SiO_{2} adakites (HSA) and low SiO_{2} adakites (LSA). It was then noted that the Archean TTGs were geochemically almost identical to high silica adakites (HSA), but slightly different from low silica adakites (LSA).

This geochemical similarity let some researchers infer that the geodynamic setting of Archean TTGs was analogous to that of modern adakites. They think that Archean TTGs were generated by hot subduction as well. Although modern adakites are rare and only found in a few localities (e.g. Adak Island in Alaska and Mindanao in the Philippines), they argue that due to a higher mantle potential temperature of the Earth, a hotter and softer crust may have enabled intense adakite-type subduction during Archean time. TTGs packages were then generated in such settings, with large scale proto-continents formed by collisions at a later stage. However, other authors doubt the existence of Archean subduction by pointing out the absence of major plate tectonic indicators during most of the Archean Eon. It is also noted that Archean TTGs were intrusive rocks while the modern adakite is extrusive in nature, thus their magma should differ in composition, especially in water content.

==== Non-plate tectonic settings ====
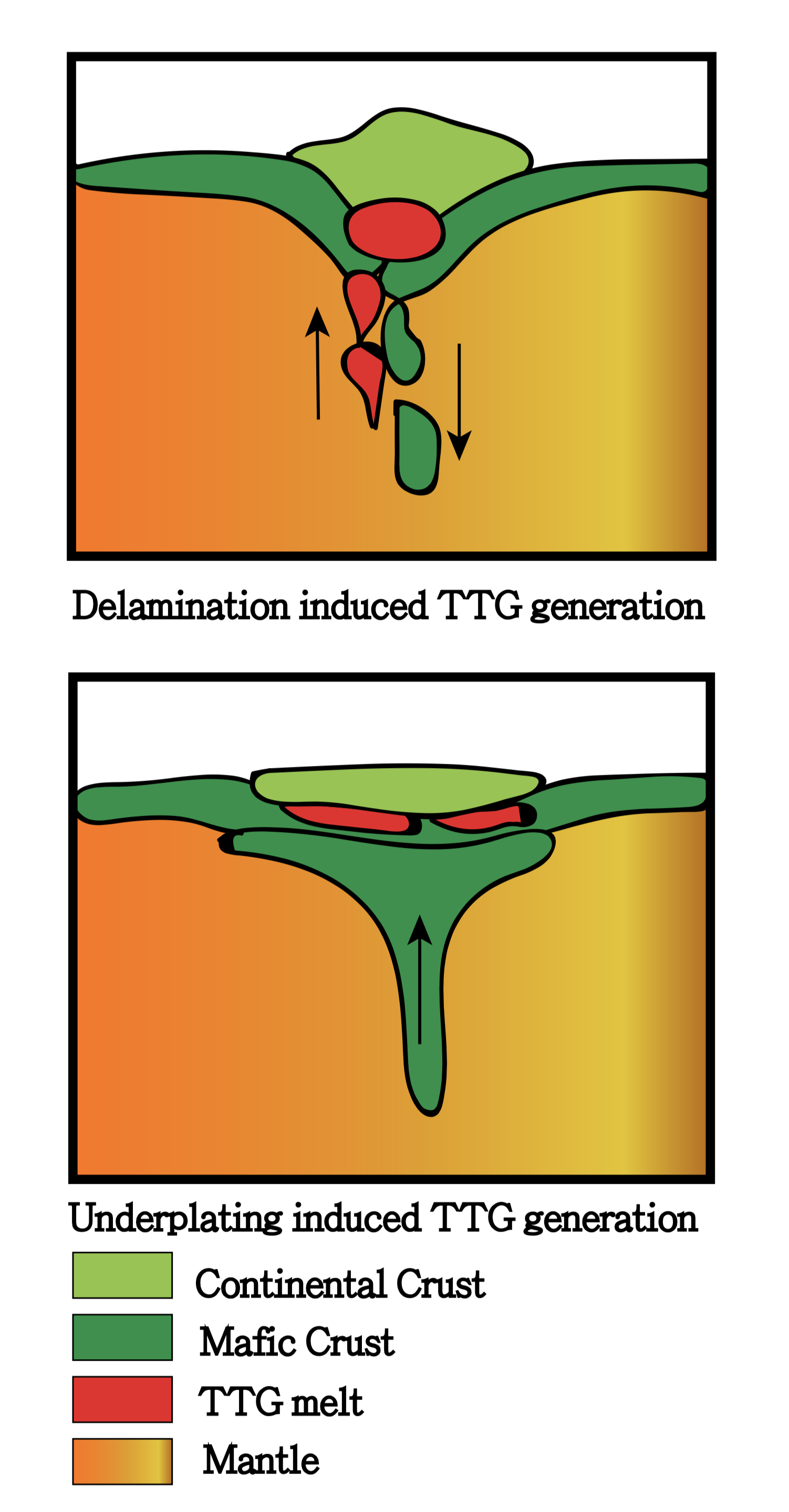
The delamination and underplating induced Archean TTG generation models. In the upper figure, heavier mafic crust delaminates into the lighter mantle. The pressure and temperature increases induce the partial melting of the delaminated mafic block to generate TTG magma, which rises and intrudes to the crust. In the lower figure, mantle plume rises to the base of the mafic crust and thicken the crust. The partial melting of the mafic crust due to the plume heating generates TTG magma intrusions. Modified from Moyen & Martin, 2012.

Various evidence has shown that Archean TTG rocks were directly derived from preexisting mafic materials. The melting temperature of meta-mafic rocks (generally between 700 °C and 1000 °C) depends primarily on their water content but only a little on pressure. Different groups of TTG should therefore have experienced distinct geothermal gradients, which corresponding to different geodynamic settings.

The low pressure group has formed along geotherms around 20–30 °C/km, which are comparable to those during the underplating of plateau bases. Mantle upwellings add mafic basement to the crust and the pressure due to the cumulation thickness may reach the requirement of low pressure TTG production. The partial melting of the plateau base (which can be induced by further mantle upwelling) would then lead to low pressure TTG generation.

The high pressure TTGs have experienced geotherms lower than 10 °C/km, which are close to modern hot subduction geotherms experienced by young slabs (but around 3 °C/km hotter than other modern subduction zones), whilst the geotherms for the most abundant TTG subseries, medium pressure group, are between 12 and 20 °C/km. Other than hot subduction, such geotherms may also be possible during the delamination of mafic crustal base. The delamination may be attributed to mantle downwelling or an increase in density of the mafic crustal base due to metamorphism or partial melt extraction. Those delaminated meta-mafic bodies then sink down, melt, and interact with surrounding mantle to generate TTGs. Such delamination induced TTG generation process is petrogenetically similar to that of subduction, both of which involves deep burial of mafic rocks into the mantle.

== Post-Archean TTG rocks ==
Post Archean TTG rocks are commonly found in arc settings, especially in continental arcs. Ophiolite also contains a small amount of TTG rocks.

=== Continental arc TTG rocks ===
Continental arc TTG rocks are often associated with gabbro, diorite, and granite, which forms a plutonic sequence in batholiths. They are formed by hundred of plutons directly related to subduction. For example, Coastal Batholith of Peru consists of 7–16% gabbro and diorite, 48–60% tonalite (including trondhjemite), and 20–30% granodiorite, with 1–4% granite. These TTG rocks in continental arc batholiths may partially originate from the magma differentiation (i.e. fractional crystallisation) of the subduction induced mantle wedge melt at depth. However, the large volume of such TTG rocks infer their major generation mechanism is by the crustal thickening induced partial melting of the former gabbroic underplate at the base of the continental crust. Tonalitic composition rock crystallised first before the magma differentiated to granodioritic and later granitic composition at a shallow depth. Some island arc plutonic roots also have TTG rocks, e.g. Tobago, but they are rarely exposed.

=== TTG rocks in ophiolite ===
Tonalites (including trondhjemites) can be found above the layered gabbro section in ophiolites, below or within sheeted dykes. They are often irregular in shape and produced by magma differentiation.

== See also ==
- Acasta Gneiss
- Archean subduction
- Eoarchean geology
