= Archean subduction =

Possible existence and nature of subduction in the Archean

Archean subduction is a contentious topic involving the possible existence and nature of subduction in the Archean, a geologic eon extending from 4.0–2.5 billion years ago. Until recently there was little evidence unequivocally supporting one side over the other, and in the past many scientists either believed in shallow subduction or its complete non-existence. However, the past two decades have witnessed the potential beginning of a change in geologic understanding as new evidence is increasingly indicative of episodic, non-shallow subduction.

== The importance of Archean subduction ==
Subduction is the density-driven process by which one tectonic plate moves under another and sinks into the mantle at a convergent boundary. Gravitational pull from dense slabs provides approximately 90% of the driving force for plate tectonics, and consequently subduction is crucial in changing the Earth's layout, guiding its thermal evolution and building its compositional structure. In particular, subduction zones are the primary sites of present-day continental crust formation, another process of modern Earth that has a mysterious past. Furthermore, subduction is the main mechanism by which surface materials enter the deep Earth and is also largely responsible for the formation of ores. Considering the importance of subduction in many geological processes, it is clear that studying its past and present nature is essential to developing our understanding of the Earth as a dynamic system.

== The case against Archean subduction ==
Those who favour non-existent subduction in the Archean point to the well-established model that the Archean Earth was significantly hotter than it is today, which would have affected lithospheric density in such a way as to perhaps prohibit subduction. The higher temperatures of the Archean Earth can be attributed to the release of tremendous amounts of energy from the accretion of Solar System material and subsequent differentiation into core and mantle. This energy, coupled with a greater concentration of heat-producing elements, led to the Earth being 200 K hotter in the Archean than it is today. Assuming seafloor spreading generated oceanic lithosphere in the Archean, higher temperatures led to greater melting of mantle material rising at oceanic spreading centres. This in turn produced thicker oceanic crust and thicker regions of underlying depleted lithospheric mantle. As such, the density of the lithosphere was reduced due to both differentiation of the crust from the mantle and the ensuing relative depletion of the residual mantle in Fe and Al. These expected properties have led to suggestions that oceanic lithosphere was so light that it subducted very shallowly or not at all. Scientists who favour this hypothesis argue that felsic material formed from hydrous partial melting of thickened oceanic crust in the root zones of oceanic plateaus, and not from subduction zones as generally believed.

== The case for Archean subduction ==
Those who favour Archean subduction claim that recent modelling has elucidated the following fundamental features of the Archean, which they argue can be used to describe why subduction was occurring:

1) Mantle temperatures were indeed 200 K hotter than they are today.

2) The oceanic crust was approximately 21 km (13 mi) thick, compared to 7 km (4.3 mi) thick today.

3) The depth to which the mantle was partially melted was 114 km (71 mi), compared to 54 km (34 mi) today.

4) Heat flow into the base of the tectonic plates was 1.3–2.0 times higher than it is today.

Mathematical reasoning based on these constraints led to the conclusion that cooling was sufficient to provide a driving force for subduction. In fact, it is thought that the low flexural rigidity of Archean plates perhaps made subduction initiation easier than it is today. On one hand, the lower density of oceanic plates reduced slab pull, but this effect was likely balanced by delamination of low-density crust as well as the passage of thick crust through the eclogite transition. In addition to modelling, geologic evidence has been discovered that further supports the existence of Archean subduction. Many Archean igneous rocks show enrichment of large-ion lithophile elements (LILE) over high-field-strength elements (HFSE), which is a classic subduction signature commonly observed in volcanic arc rocks. Furthermore, the presence of structural thrust belts and paired metamorphic belts are also hallmarks of subduction dynamics and subsequent environmental changes.

While the existence of Archean subduction implies that continental crust likely formed via subduction to an extent, it does not require that subduction was the only way to form continental crust. Thus the continued debate over the origin of continental crust cannot be fully resolved by subduction arguments alone.

== Conclusion and future directions ==
Though the subject of Archean subduction has long been controversial, the emergence of innovative modelling and geologic evidence has begun to sway some of the scientific community toward favouring the existence of non-shallow, episodic subduction. Moving forward, the rheology of early-Earth materials should be emphasized in future research as it is not well understood, and therefore subduction dynamics are poorly constrained. Moreover, the paucity of Archean data requires an even better understanding of the links between the Earth's interior and its surface processes if we plan on gaining additional insight into Archean subduction.
