= Trondhjemite =

Light-colored intrusive igneous rock

- Igneous rock
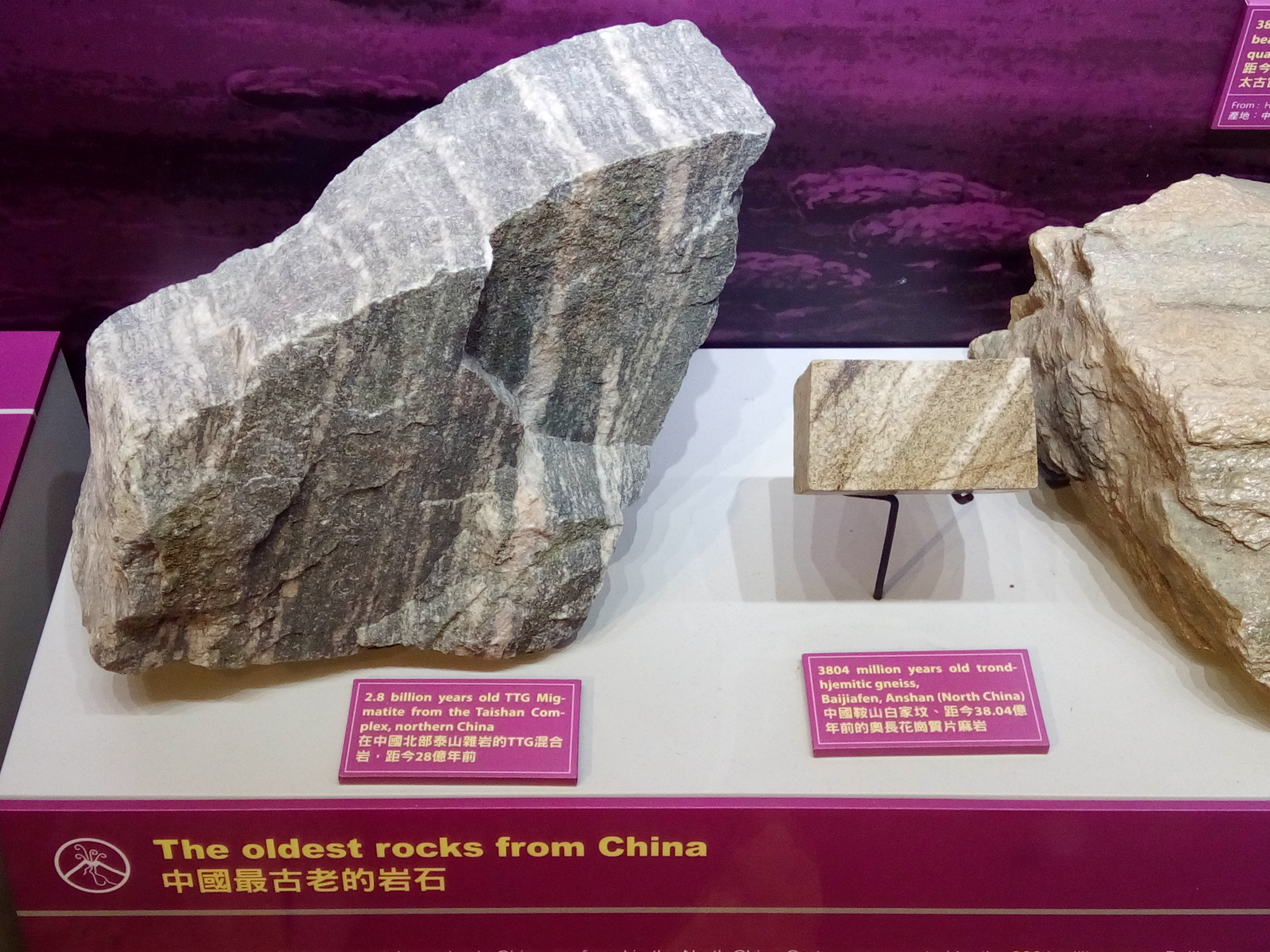
- Tonalite-trondhjemite-granodiorite migmatite (left) and trondhjemitic gneiss (right) from northern China

Composition
- plagioclase: (albite to andesine), quartz, alkali feldspar

Trondhjemites are leucotonalites, a variety of leucocratic tonalite in which the modal mineralogy mostly consists of plagioclase in the form of albite to andesine, >20% quartz, and <10% alkali feldspar. Trondhjemites that occur in the oceanic crust or in ophiolites are usually called plagiogranites.

Trondhjemites are common in Archean terranes, occurring in conjunction with tonalite and granodiorite as the TTG (tonalite-trondhjemite-granodiorite) orthogneiss suite. Trondhjemite dikes also commonly form part of the sheeted dike complex of an ophiolite.

The rock type was first described by Victor Goldschmidt in 1916. The name of the rock type is derived from the city of Trondheim, Norway. Despite the name and locality, the Trondheim trondhjemites are not considered ideal type specimen because greenschist metamorphism has erased their original mineralogy. Other well-known trondhjemite localities include the Rio Brazos quartz-eye trondhjemite in the Brazos Mountains, New Mexico, the Twilight Gneiss of the Needle Mountains, Colorado, trondhjemites of the Wind River Range, Wyoming, the Trinity Alps of California, and areas near Riggins, Idaho.

== Formation ==
Generation of trondhjemite-tonalitic magmas are understood be caused by fractionation of wet basaltic and/or dry low-K tholeiitic-andesitic magmas caused by partial melting of quartz eclogites, amphibolites or gabbros.
