= Standard atmosphere =

Standard atmosphere may refer to:

- A standard reference value for air pressure:
  - Standard atmosphere (unit), a standard pressure that approximates atmospheric pressure value at sea level
  - Standard atmospheric pressure, other reference values
- One of various static atmospheric models of how atmospheric pressure, density, and temperature vary with altitude, such as:
  - The U.S. Standard Atmosphere, a series of models that give values for pressure, density, and temperature over a range of altitudes
  - The International Standard Atmosphere (ISA), an international standard model, defining typical atmospheric properties with altitude, at mid-latitude

== See also ==
- NRLMSISE-00
- Standard conditions for temperature and pressure
