= Bruce Bowman =

American aerospace engineer (1945–2020)

- Born: Bruce Ronald Bowman; February 4, 1945
- Died: December 31, 2020 (aged 75); Colorado Springs, Colorado, U.S.
- Known for: Jacchia-Bowman Density Model
- Spouse: Esther Bowman

Academic background
- Education: University of California, Berkeley (BA); University of Hawaiʻi at Mānoa (MS)

Academic work
- Institutions: U.S. Air Force Space Command
- Main interests: Astrodynamics; reference atmospheric model; geodesy; orbital mechanics

Bruce Ronald Bowman (February 4, 1945 – December 31, 2020) was an American aerospace engineer. He was an astrodynamicist at the U.S. Air Force Space Command from 2000 to 2013. He developed the Jacchia-Bowman Density Model, a reference atmosphere used widely for spacecraft orbit determination and atmospheric entry simulations.

== Early life and education ==
Bowman was born in 1945. As a child, he saw Sputnik 1 orbit overhead in 1957. He earned a Bachelor of Arts in astronomy from the University of California, Berkeley in 1967. He later earned a Master of Science from the University of Hawaiʻi at Mānoa in 1974, where he studied satellite geodesy and geophysics.

== Career ==
After graduating, Bowman joined the U.S. Air Force as a commissioned officer, serving as a captain. He was a contractor in the federal civilian service for twenty years.

Bowman joined the Air Force Space Command as an astrodynamicist in 2000. He worked on the High Accuracy Satellite Density Model (HASDM) and associated satellite constellation used for calibration, serving until 2013. He was appointed a senior research scientist at Space Environment Technologies, where he worked until 2020. He was a senior member of the American Institute of Aeronautics and Astronautics (AIAA).

His research focused on the analysis of atmospheric drag on satellite orbits caused by solar heating and geomagnetic storms, influenced by research from Luigi Giuseppe Jacchia, Franco Verniani, and Charles E. Roberts. In 2006 and 2008, he published a revision of Jacchia's Reference Atmosphere called the Jacchia-Bowman Density Model (JB2008) in which he parametrized important processes in the upper atmosphere, including density variations, semiannual perturbations, and drag variations. The model is considered the most significant improvement on thermosphere density modeling since the 1970s. It is widely used for modeling ballistic coefficients, improving collision avoidance, analyzing spacecraft accelerometer data, and simulating orbit decay in transitional and free molecular flow.

The Committee on Space Research (COSPAR) adopted the Jacchia-Bowman model in the COSPAR International Reference Atmosphere, and the International Organization for Standardization adopted the model as the standard for the upper atmosphere (IS 14222). The United States Space Command uses the model to propagate orbit predictions for every satellite in low Earth orbit.

He died in Colorado Springs, Colorado in 2020, aged 75.

== Personal life ==
He married Esther Bowman in 1979. The couple resided in Colorado and had three children.

== Awards ==
- Outstanding Senior Civilian Scientist Award, U.S. Air Force (2007)
- Rotary National Award for Space Achievement (2008)
- Analyst Lifetime Achievement Award, U.S. Air Force (2015)
