= Density altitude =

Altitude relative to standard atmospheric conditions

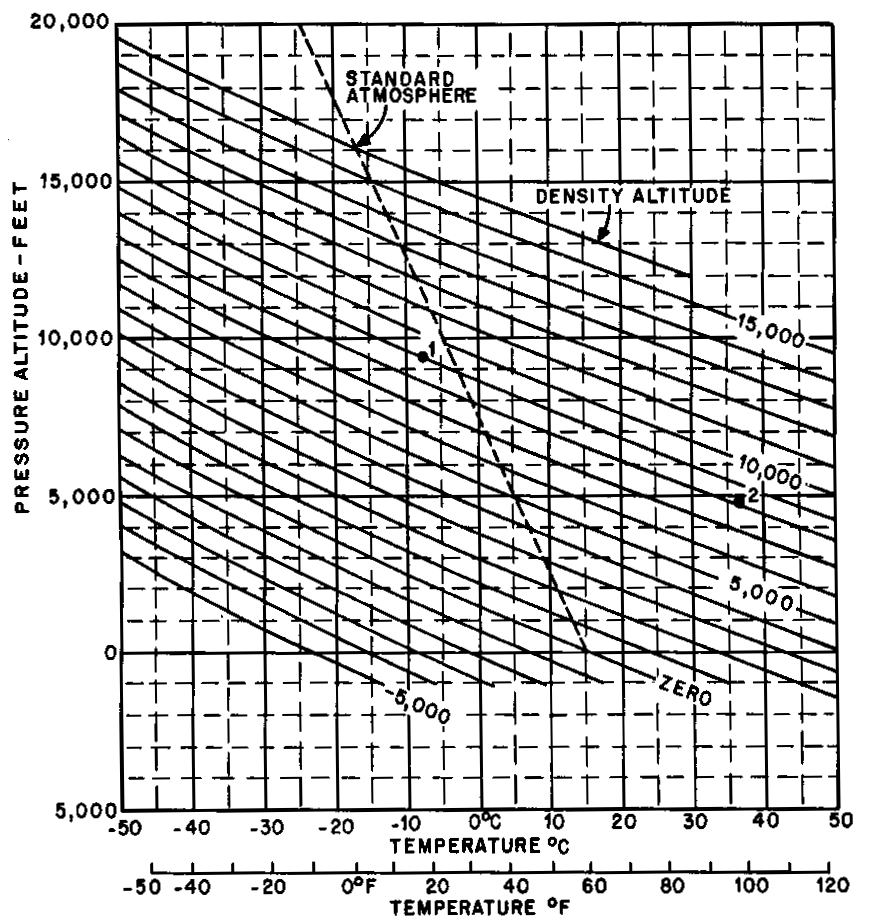
Density Altitude Computation Chart

The density altitude is the altitude relative to standard atmospheric conditions at which the air density would be equal to the indicated air density at the place of observation. In other words, the density altitude is the air density given as a height above mean sea level. The density altitude can also be considered to be the pressure altitude adjusted for a non-standard temperature.

Both an increase in the temperature and a decrease in the atmospheric pressure, and, to a much lesser degree, an increase in the humidity, will cause an increase in the density altitude. In hot and humid conditions, the density altitude at a particular location may be significantly higher than the true altitude.

In aviation, the density altitude is used to assess an aircraft's aerodynamic performance under certain weather conditions. The lift generated by the aircraft's airfoils, and the relation between its indicated airspeed (IAS) and its true airspeed (TAS), are also subject to air-density changes. Furthermore, the power delivered by the aircraft's engine is affected by the density and composition of the atmosphere.

== Aircraft safety ==
Air density is perhaps the single most important factor affecting aircraft performance. It has a direct bearing on:

- The ability of a wing to create lift.
- The efficiency of a propeller or rotor – which for a propeller (effectively an airfoil) behaves similarly to lift on a wing.
- The power output of a normally-aspirated engine – the power output depends on the oxygen intake, so the engine output is reduced as the equivalent dry-air density decreases, and it produces even less power as moisture displaces oxygen in more humid conditions.

Aircraft taking off from a “hot and high” airport, such as the Quito Airport or Mexico City, are at a significant aerodynamic disadvantage. The following effects result from a density altitude that is higher than the actual physical altitude:

- An aircraft will accelerate more slowly on takeoff as a result of its reduced power production.
- An aircraft will climb more slowly as a result of its reduced power production.

Due to these performance issues, an aircraft's takeoff weight may need to be lowered, or takeoffs may need to be scheduled for cooler times of the day. The wind direction and the runway slope may need to be taken into account.

High density altitude can also affect operations at low-elevation airports during hot weather. This makes density altitude calculations especially important during preflight performance planning.

== Skydiving ==
The density altitude is an important factor in skydiving, and one that can be difficult to judge properly, even for experienced skydivers. In addition to the general change in wing efficiency that is common to all aviation, skydiving has additional considerations. There is an increased risk due to the high mobility of jumpers (who will often travel to a drop zone with a completely different density altitude than they are used to, without being made consciously aware of it by the routine of calibrating to QNH/QFE). Another factor is the higher susceptibility to hypoxia at high density altitudes, which, combined especially with the unexpected higher free-fall rate, can create dangerous situations and accidents. Parachutes at higher altitudes fly more aggressively, making their effective area smaller, which is more demanding for a pilot's skill and can be especially dangerous for high-performance landings, which require accurate estimates and have a low margin of error before they become dangerous.

== Calculation ==
The density altitude can be calculated from the atmospheric pressure and the outside air temperature (assuming dry air) using the following formula:

$$\text{DA} \approx \frac{T_\text{SL}}{\Gamma} \left[ 1 - \left( \frac{P / P_\text{SL}}{T / T_\text{SL}} \right)^{\left(\frac{g M}{\Gamma R} - 1\right)^{-1}} \right].$$

In this formula,

$\text{DA}$, density altitude in meters (m);
$P$, (static) atmospheric pressure;
$P_\text{SL}$, standard sea-level atmospheric pressure, International Standard Atmosphere (ISA): 1013.25 hectopascals (hPa), or U.S. Standard Atmosphere: 29.92 inches of mercury (inHg);
$T$, outside air temperature in kelvins (K);
$T_\text{SL}$ = 288.15 K, ISA sea-level air temperature;
$\Gamma$ = 0.0065 K/m, ISA temperature lapse rate (below 11 km);
$R$ ≈ 8.3144598 J/mol·K, ideal gas constant;
$g$ ≈ 9.80665 m/s^{2}, gravitational acceleration;
$M$ ≈ 0.028964 kg/mol, molar mass of dry air.

=== The National Weather Service (NWS) formula ===
The National Weather Service uses the following dry-air approximation to the formula for the density altitude above in its standard:

$$\text{DA}_\text{NWS} = 145442.16 ~ \text{ft} \left( 1 - \left[ 17.326 ~ \frac{^\circ \text{F}}{\text{inHg}} \ \frac{P}{459.67 ~ {{}^\circ \text{F}} + T} \right]^{0.235} \right).$$

In this formula,

$\text{DA}_\text{NWS}$, National Weather Service density altitude in feet ($\text{ft}$);
$P$, station pressure (static atmospheric pressure) in inches of mercury (inHg);
$T$, station temperature (outside air temperature) in degrees Fahrenheit (°F).

Note that the NWS standard specifies that the density altitude should be rounded to the nearest 100 ft.

=== Approximation formula for calculating the density altitude from the pressure altitude ===
This is an easier formula to calculate (with great approximation) the density altitude from the pressure altitude and the ISA temperature deviation:

$$\text{DA} \approx \text{PA} + 118.8 ~ \frac{\text{ft}}{{^\circ \text{C}}} \left(T_\text{OA} - T_\text{ISA}\right).$$

In this formula,

$\text{PA}$, pressure altitude in feet (ft) $\approx \text{station elevation in feet} + 27 ~ \frac{\text{ft}}{\text{mb}} (1013 ~ \text{mb} - \text{QNH})$;
$\text{QNH}$, atmospheric pressure in millibars (mb) adjusted to mean sea level;
$T_\text{OA}$, outside air temperature in degrees Celsius (°C);
$T_\text{ISA} \approx 15 ~ {{}^\circ \text{C}} - 1.98 ~ {{}^\circ \text{C}} \, \frac{\text{PA}}{1000 ~ \text{ft}}$, assuming that the outside air temperature falls at the rate of 1.98 °C per 1,000 ft of altitude until the tropopause (at 36,000 ft) is reached.

Rounding up 1.98 °C to 2 °C, this approximation simplifies to become

$$\begin{align}
\text{DA}
& \approx \text{PA} + 118.8 ~ \frac{\text{ft}}{^\circ \text{C}} \left[ T_\text{OA} + \frac{\text{PA}}{500 ~ \text{ft}} {^\circ \text{C}} - 15 ~ {^\circ \text{C}} \right] \\[3pt]
& =       1.2376 \, \text{PA} + 118.8 ~ \frac{\text{ft}}{{}^\circ \text{C}} \, T_\text{OA} - 1782 ~ \text{ft}.
\end{align}$$

== See also ==
- Outside air temperature
- Barometric formula
- Density of air
- Hot and high
- Box canyon (aviation)
- List of longest runways
