= Jacchia Reference Atmosphere =

The Jacchia Reference Atmosphere is a reference atmospheric model that defines values of atmospheric temperature, density, pressure and composition at altitudes of 90 to 2500 km. It is widely used for spacecraft orbit determination, atmospheric entry modeling, and orbital decay prediction in aerospace.

The model was developed by Italian physicist Luigi Giuseppe Jacchia at the Smithsonian Astrophysical Observatory (SAO) and first published in 1970. It is based on spacecraft drag data from early NASA missions, including Explorer 8. The model was expanded by mathematician Charles E. Roberts and republished in 1971 and 1977 as the Jacchia-Roberts Model. An updated form was published by Bruce Bowman as the Jacchia-Bowman Model in 2006 and 2008.

Unlike the more common US Standard Atmosphere and related models, the Jacchia model includes latitudinal, seasonal, geomagnetic, and solar effects, but must be supplemented with another model at lower altitudes. The model assumes diffusion equilibrium above the turbopause. Density profiles are determined by a single master variable, the exospheric temperature. The statistical accuracy of the model is approximately 15%. A common operational assumption is that the atmosphere rotates with the Earth as a rigid body.

== Background and development ==
The Jacchia Reference Atmosphere was developed by Luigi Giuseppe Jacchia, a physicist at the Smithsonian Astrophysical Observatory (SAO) in 1970 and updated in 1971 and 1977. It originated in the early Space Age, when orbital decay data from newly launched satellites provided the first systematic means of probing atmospheric density in the thermosphere. Jacchia began working at the SAO in 1956, analyzing photographic tracking data from the Baker-Nunn camera network to deduce density perturbations from orbital element histories. He identified a roughly 27-day periodicity in orbital decay rates correlated with the solar rotation period, establishing the coupling between solar activity and thermospheric heating. He also characterized the diurnal density variation, winning the Hodgkins Medal in 1980 for the discovery. Jacchia first published a static diffusion model in 1964.

The three principal models include

- J70 — Original model (1970) with core mathematical framework. Includes static models of the thermosphere and exposphere and empirical temperature profiles.
- J71 — First revision (1971) with additional satellite drag data and refined treatment of thermospheric variation.
- J77 — Final revision (1977) with composition measurements from the OGO-6 and ESRO-4 satellite mass spectrometers and updated semi-annual and geomagnetic variations.

Jacchia also contributed the thermospheric portion (110–200 km) to the CIRA-72 model.

== Model structure ==
The models cover 90 to 2,500 km altitude and track the number densities of diatomic nitrogen, monatomic and diatomic oxygen, argon, helium, and hydrogen as separate profiles. Auxiliary tables are provided for evaluating geomagnetic, semi-annual, and seasonal–latitudinal corrections. Tabulated values span exospheric temperatures from 500 to 2,600 K.

=== Assumptions ===
Above the turbopause (~110 km), the model assumes diffusive equilibrium. Each species diffuses independently under gravity and its own pressure gradient rather than mixing as a bulk fluid. This allows each constituent to have its own scale height, producing the observed enrichment of lighter species at high altitudes.

The entire density profile is determined by the exospheric temperature T_{∞}, defined as the asymptotic temperature of the thermosphere at high altitude. All density and composition profiles are derived from this single parameter via the temperature profile and diffusion equations. A common operational assumption is that the atmosphere undergoes rigid-body co-rotation with the Earth, simplifying the computation of satellite–atmosphere relative velocity for drag calculations, though this approximation degrades at the highest altitudes.

=== Environmental inputs ===
The exospheric temperature is computed from empirical formulae requiring two indices:

- F10.7 — the 10.7 cm solar radio flux, used as a proxy for solar extreme-ultraviolet (EUV) output. Both the daily value and an 81-day centered running mean are used.
- K_{p} / a_{p} — geomagnetic activity indices parameterizing magnetospheric energy deposition into the thermosphere.

=== Numerical integration ===
In the original Jacchia formulation, density and composition at a given altitude are obtained by numerical integration of the diffusion equation upward from the 90 km lower boundary. This produces accurate results but is computationally intensive, requiring many function evaluations per altitude query — a significant constraint for real-time orbit propagation.

== Jacchia-Roberts model ==
Because orbit propagators may evaluate atmospheric density thousands of times per orbit, the computational cost of Jacchia's numerical integration was a practical obstacle for real-time applications. American mathematician Charles E. Roberts addressed this by deriving analytic closed-form expressions of the barometric and diffusion differential equations, eliminating iterative quadrature.

=== Formulation ===
The Jacchia-Roberts model produces densities identical to J70 between 90 and 125 km, and closely approximates J70 values above 125 km. The analytic expressions are based on direct integration of the governing differential equations, yielding algebraic formulae evaluable without numerical quadrature. The result retains full sensitivity to T_{∞} and therefore to the F10.7 and K_{p} inputs that drive the Jacchia framework.

The computational advantage of JR71 is substantial: the model runs approximately 10 times faster than NRLMSISE-00 and roughly 70 times faster than JB2008.

=== Later analytic extensions ===
De Lafontaine and Hughes (1983) extended the analytic approach to J77, deriving closed-form density expressions whose intermediate tuning parameters can be adjusted to fit any Jacchia-type reference model. Their formulation additionally ensures continuity of the first derivative at all altitude boundaries, an improvement over earlier analytic versions. A polynomial analytic version of J77 was also developed by Lineberry.

== Jacchia-Bowman model ==
In 2006 and 2008, American aerodynamicist Bruce R. Bowman at the U.S. Air Force Space Command published a revision based on Jacchia’s diffusion equations with updated exospheric temperature equations, density equations, and geomagnetic storm effects. The model was validated through comparisons with drag data computed for satellites in the range 175 to 1000 km altitude, including CHAMP and GRACE, and compared to the J70 and NRLMSIS 2000 models.

The Committee on Space Research (COSPAR) adopted the Jacchia-Bowman model in the COSPAR International Reference Atmosphere, and the International Organization for Standardization adopted the model as the standard for the upper atmosphere (IS 14222).

== Applications ==
The dominant non-gravitational perturbation on satellites below ~600 km is atmospheric drag. Accurate density estimates are required for orbital decay prediction, conjunction analysis, and maneuver planning. Errors in the density model propagate directly into errors in predicted satellite position, making model selection and calibration critical for high-accuracy orbit determination. The analytic Jacchia-Roberts formulation was adopted for real-time and near-real-time orbit propagation because of its computational efficiency while maintaining fidelity to the Jacchia physical framework.

The model is implemented in several widely used astrodynamics software packages. Systems Tool Kit (STK), developed by Ansys (formerly AGI), supports Jacchia-Roberts as an atmosphere model option for satellite analysis. FreeFlyer, developed by AI Solutions, provides a documented Jacchia-Roberts implementation used in mission analysis and flight dynamics operations. GMAT, NASA's open-source General Mission Analysis Tool, also implements JR71 for trajectory analysis and orbit determination.

The J70 model (in modified form) was used as the baseline atmosphere for all Marshall Space Flight Center (MSFC) orbital mechanics analyses, including orbital lifetime estimation and attitude control studies. The United States Space Force Combat Forces Command continued operational use of a J70 variant for the Space Surveillance Network for an extended period, in part due to the difficulty of re-validating legacy software against newer models.

The Jacchia-Roberts model is also used for computing estimated reentry times for objects in low Earth orbit, where long-term density modelling across a wide range of altitudes and solar flux conditions is required.

Studies assessing atmospheric density model performance using catalogued debris, including calibration spheres deployed by Space Shuttle missions tracked via NORAD two-line elements (TLEs), used J71 as a benchmark reference.

== Comparison with MSIS models ==
The principal competing model family is the MSIS series, developed at the United States Naval Research Laboratory from incoherent scatter radar and mass spectrometer data. Jacchia's original satellite drag dataset was incorporated into the NRLMSIS observational database, making the Jacchia observations a foundational input to later MSIS development rather than a purely competing data source. Comparative evaluations have found that the fitting process in operational orbit determination, which calibrates the ballistic coefficient over several days, tends to mask qualitative differences between density models, with J70 and MSISE-90 showing comparable performance for special perturbations orbit determination.

== Successors ==
Descendants of the Jacchia family of models include the Marshall Engineering Thermosphere (MET) model, the Earth Global Reference Atmosphere Model (Earth-GRAM), and the NRLMSISE-00 model by the U.S. Naval Research Laboratory.

== See also ==
- Atmospheric models
- NRLMSISE-00
- International Standard Atmosphere
- US Standard Atmosphere
- COSPAR International Reference Atmosphere

== Bibliography ==
- Jacchia, L. G. (1964). Static Diffusion Models of the Upper Atmosphere with Empirical Temperature Profiles (SAO Special Report). Smithsonian Astrophysical Observatory. B08448.
- Jacchia, L. G. (1970). New Static Models of the Thermosphere and Exosphere with Empirical Temperature Profiles (SAO Special Report). Smithsonian Astrophysical Observatory.
- Jacchia, L. G. (1971). Revised Static Models of the Thermosphere and Exosphere with Empirical Temperature Profiles (SAO Special Report). Smithsonian Astrophysical Observatory. B10091.
- Jacchia, L. G. (1977). Thermospheric Temperature, Density, and Composition: New Models (SAO Special Report). Smithsonian Astrophysical Observatory.
- Roberts, C. E. Jr. (1971). "An analytic model for upper atmosphere densities based upon Jacchia's 1970 models". Celestial Mechanics. 4 (3–4): 368–377. Bibcode:1971CeMec...4..368R. doi:10.1007/BF01231398.
- De Lafontaine, J.; Hughes, P. (1983). "An analytic version of Jacchia's 1977 model atmosphere". Celestial Mechanics. 29 (1): 3–26. doi:10.1007/BF01358597.
- Picone, J. M.; Hedin, A. E.; Drob, D. P.; Aikin, A. C. (2002). "NRLMSISE-00 empirical model of the atmosphere: Statistical comparisons and scientific issues". Journal of Geophysical Research: Space Physics. 107 (A12): SIA 15-1–SIA 15-16. Bibcode:2002JGRA..107.1468P. doi:10.1029/2002JA009430.
- Bowman, B. R.; Tobiska, W. K.; Marcos, F. A.; Huang, C. Y.; Lin, C. S.; Burke, W. J. (2008). "A new empirical thermospheric density model JB2008 using new solar and geomagnetic indices". AIAA/AAS Astrodynamics Specialist Conference. Honolulu, Hawaii.
- COSPAR (1972). COSPAR International Reference Atmosphere 1972 (Report). Berlin: Akademie-Verlag.
- MSFC (1973). Terrestrial Environment (Climatic) Criteria Guidelines for Use in Aerospace Vehicle Development (Report). NASA Marshall Space Flight Center.
- Emmanuelli, A. (2024). Onboard atmospheric density estimation for LEO spacecraft (Thesis).
- AGI (2023). "STK Atmosphere Models". Ansys AGI.
- AISolutions (2023). "Jacchia-Roberts Density Model". AI Solutions.
- GMAT (2023). "GMAT User Guide: Atmosphere Model". NASA.
