= Charles E. Roberts (mathematician) =

American mathematician (1942–2023)

- Born: Charles Emery Roberts, Jr; October 9, 1942; Washington, D.C., U.S.
- Died: March 26, 2023 (aged 80); Naperville, Illinois, U.S.
- Known for: Jacchia-Roberts Density Model
- Spouse: Imogene Roberts (m. 1963)

Academic background
- Education: Indiana State University (BS); University of Illinois Urbana-Champaign (MS, PhD)
- Thesis: On the behaviour of the integral curves of a third autonomous system of differential equations in a neighborhood of a critical point (1968)
- Doctoral advisor: Geneva G. Belford

Academic work
- Institutions: Indiana State University
- Main interests: Differential equations; reference atmospheric model; combinatorics

Charles Emery Roberts Jr. (October 9, 1942 – March 26, 2023) was an American mathematician. He was a professor of mathematics at Indiana State University from 1971 to 2017. He developed the Jacchia-Roberts Atmospheric Model used widely for orbit determination and spacecraft atmospheric entry simulations in aerospace.

== Early life and education ==
Roberts was born in 1942 in Washington, D.C. to Evelyn and Charles Roberts Sr. He attended North Posey High School and graduated as valedictorian in 1960. He studied mathematics at Indiana State University, where he graduated summa cum laude in 1964 before attending the University of Illinois Urbana-Champaign, where he earned a master's in 1965. He studied under Geneva G. Belford and produced a thesis on the integral curves of differential equations, earning a doctorate in 1968.

== Career ==
After graduating from the University of Illinois, Roberts began working with Pan-American Airlines in Cape Canaveral, Florida from 1968 to 1970. He wrote satellite tracking programs in conjunction with NASA during the Apollo missions, including Apollo 11.

In 1971, he returned to Indiana State and became a professor of mathematics. Roberts wrote multiple textbooks on mathematical proofs and differential equations. In 1971, he published a modified version of the reference atmosphere developed by Luigi Giuseppe Jacchia in 1970. In it, he used an asymptotic function to derive an integrable form of the differential equations used to model barometric and molecular diffusion in the upper atmosphere. The Jacchia-Roberts Density Model is widely used in aerospace applications to model satellite orbital decay, compute orbit determination, and re-entry trajectories.

He also published papers on celestial mechanics and developed methods for using power series to generate trajectories for orbital and suborbital vehicles. His mathematics research also dealt with Hammerstein operators and combinatorial theory. Roberts received the Theodore Dreiser Distinguished Research Award in 2010. He retired in 2017.

Roberts died in 2023 in Naperville, Illinois, aged 80.

== Personal life ==
He married Imogene Roberts on August 25, 1963. They lived in Terre Haute, Indiana and were married for 59 years until her death two weeks before his own. According to his wishes, his body was donated to the Anatomical Gift Association of Chicago.

== Books ==
- Ordinary Differential Equations: A Computation Approach (Prentice Hall, 1979) ISBN 9780136397571
- Elementary Differential Equations: Applications, Models, and Computing (Chapman & Hall, 2010) ISBN 9781041151463
- Introduction to Mathematical Proofs (Chapman & Hall, 2015) ISBN 9781032920238
