= Jacchia =

Jacchia is a surname. Notable people with the surname include:

- Agide Jacchia (1875–1932), Italian orchestral director
- Alessandro Jacchia (born 1960), Italian television and film producer
- Luigi Giuseppe Jacchia (1910-1996), Italian-American physicist and astronomer

Other topics included the name:

- Jacchia Reference Atmosphere, atmospheric model

== See also ==
- Asteroid 2079 Jacchia, named after astronomer Luigi Giuseppe Jacchia
