= Scale length =

Scale length may refer to:

- Length scale (or "scale length"), a significant concept in physics used to define the order of magnitude of a system
- Scale height (or "scale length"), a specific parameter in physics denoting the distance over which a quantity decreases by a factor of e
- Scale length (string instruments), a measurement of the length of a musical instrument string
