= Jet standard atmosphere =

Reference atmospheric model

The Jet Standard Atmosphere is a reference atmospheric model often used by jet manufacturers. It is a derivation and extension of the International Standard Atmosphere (ISA). It assumes a mean sea-level temperature of +15 °C (59 °F). The temperature then lapses 2 °C per 1,000 feet (300 m) to infinity. There is no tropopause in the jet standard atmosphere. In the ISA, the tropopause is the height at which the temperature stops decreasing, and is also the end of the troposphere and the start of the stratosphere.

== See also ==
- International Standard Atmosphere
- U.S. Standard Atmosphere
