= Standard temperature and pressure =

Reference values for temperature and pressure

Standard temperature and pressure (STP), or standard conditions for temperature and pressure, are various standard sets of conditions for experimental measurements used to allow comparisons to be made between different sets of data. The most used standards are those of the International Union of Pure and Applied Chemistry (IUPAC) and the National Institute of Standards and Technology (NIST), although these are not universally accepted. Other organizations have established a variety of other definitions.

In industry and commerce, the standard conditions for temperature and pressure are often necessary for expressing the volumes of gases and liquids and related quantities such as the rate of volumetric flow (the volumes of gases vary significantly with temperature and pressure): standard cubic meters per second (Sm^{3}/s), and normal cubic meters per second (Nm^{3}/s).

Many technical publications (books, journals, advertisements for equipment and machinery) simply state "standard conditions" without specifying them, often substituting the term with older "normal conditions", or "NC". In special cases this can lead to confusion and errors. Good practice always incorporates the reference conditions of temperature and pressure. If not stated, some room environment conditions are supposed, close to 1 atm pressure, 25 °C (77.00 °F), and 0% humidity.

== Definitions ==
=== Main definitions ===
In chemistry, IUPAC changed its definition of standard temperature and pressure in 1982:

- Until 1982, STP was defined as a temperature of 273.15 K (0.00 °C; 32.00 °F) and an absolute pressure of exactly 1 standard atmosphere (101,325.000 Pa).
- Since 1982, STP has still been defined as a temperature of 273.15 K (0.00 °C; 32.00 °F) but defined with an absolute pressure of exactly 1 bar (100,000.000 Pa).

IUPAC also defines SATP (Standard Ambient Temperature and Pressure) as a temperature of 298.15 K (25.00 °C; 77.00 °F) and an absolute pressure of exactly 1 atm (101.325 kPa).

NIST uses a temperature of 20 °C (293.15 K; 68.00 °F) and an absolute pressure of 1 atm (101.325 kPa). This standard is also called normal temperature and pressure (abbreviated as NTP). However, a common temperature and pressure in use by NIST for thermodynamic experiments is 298.15 K (25.00 °C; 77.00 °F) and 1 bar (100.000 kPa). NIST also uses 15 °C (288.15 K; 59.00 °F) for the temperature compensation of refined petroleum products, despite noting that these two values are not exactly consistent with each other.

The ISO 13443 standard reference conditions for natural gas and similar fluids are 288.15 K (15.00 °C; 59.00 °F) and 1 atm (101.325 kPa); by contrast, the American Petroleum Institute adopts 60 °F (15.56 °C; 288.71 K).

=== Past uses ===
Before 1918, many professionals and scientists using the metric system of units defined the standard reference conditions of temperature and pressure for expressing gas volumes as being 15 °C (288.15 K; 59.00 °F) and 101.325 kPa (1.00 atm; 760 Torr). During those same years, the most commonly used standard reference conditions for people using the imperial or U.S. customary systems was 60 °F (15.56 °C; 288.71 K) and 14.696 psi (1.00 atm) because it was almost universally used by the oil and gas industries worldwide. The above definitions are no longer the most commonly used in either system of units.

=== Current use ===
Many different definitions of standard reference conditions are currently being used by organizations all over the world. The table below lists a few of them, but there are more. Some of these organizations used other standards in the past. For example, IUPAC's new value is the mean atmospheric pressure at an altitude of about 112 metres, which is closer to the worldwide median altitude of human habitation (194 m), and follows the metric system (Pascal is a metric unit, while atmosphere is not).

Natural gas companies in Europe, Australia, and South America have adopted 15 °C (288.15 K; 59.00 °F) and 1 atm (101.325 kPa) as their standard gas volume reference conditions, used as the base values for defining the standard cubic meter. Also, the International Organization for Standardization (ISO), the United States Environmental Protection Agency (EPA) and National Institute of Standards and Technology (NIST) each have more than one definition of standard reference conditions in their various standards and regulations.

=== Comparison table ===
Standard reference conditions in current use
Temperature		Pressure				Humidity	Publishing or establishing entity
°C	°F	kPa	mmHg	psi	inHg	%	Publishing or establishing entity
0	32	100.000	750.06	14.5038	29.530		IUPAC (STP) since 1982
0	32	101.325	760.00	14.6959	29.921		NIST, ISO 10780, formerly IUPAC (STP) until 1982
0	32	101.325	760.00	14.6959	29.921	0	DIN 1343:1990 ("Normal" conditions e.g. Nm³/hr)
15	59	99.99	750.0	14.503	29.53	78	U.S. Army Standard Metro (Note: The pressure is specified as 750 mmHg. However, the mmHg is temperature-dependent, since mercury expands as temperature goes up. Here the values for the 0–20 °C range are given.)
15	59	100.000	750.06	14.5038	29.530		SPE
15	59	101.3	760	14.70	29.92		FAA
15	59	101.325	760.00	14.6959	29.921	0	ICAO's ISA, ISO 13443, EEA, EGIA (Note: Electricity and Gas Inspection Act (of Canada).) (SI Definition), Air density 1.225 kg/m³
15	59	101.325	760.00	14.6959	29.921	0	ISO 2533:1975 ISO 13443:2005, ISO 7504:2015
15	59	101.33	760.0	14.696	29.92	60	ISO 2314, ISO 3977-2, ASHRAE Fundamentals Handbook
15.56	60	101.33	760.0	14.696	29.92		SPE, U.S. OSHA, SCAQMD
15.56	60	101.35	760.21	14.7	29.93		U.S. DOT (SCF)
15.56	60	101.6	762	14.73	30.0		EGIA (Imperial System Definition)
20	68	100.000	750.06	14.5038	29.530	0	CAGI
20	68	101.3	760	14.69	29.9	50	ISO 5011
20	68	101.325	760.00	14.6959	29.921		EN 14511-1:2013
20	68	101.325	760.00	14.6959	29.921		EPA, NIST (also called NTP, Normal Temperature and Pressure)
20	68	101.33	760.0	14.696	29.92	0	GOST 2939-63
21.11	70	101.3	760	14.70	29.92	0	AMCA, (Note: The standard is given as 29.92 inHg at an unspecified temperature. This most likely corresponds to a standard pressure of 101.325 kPa, converted into ~29.921 inHg at 32 °F (0 °C).) air density = 0.075 lbm/ft³
22	71.6	101.325	760.00	14.6959	29.921	20–80	American Association of Physicists in Medicine
25	77	101.325	760.00	14.6959	29.921		IUPAC (SATP), EPA

== International Standard Atmosphere ==
In aeronautics and fluid dynamics the "International Standard Atmosphere" (ISA) is a specification of pressure, temperature, density, and speed of sound at each altitude. At standard mean sea level it specifies a temperature of 15 °C (59 °F), pressure of 101,325 pascals (14.6959 psi) (1 atm), and a density of 1.2250 kilograms per cubic meter (0.07647 lb/cu ft). It also specifies a temperature lapse rate of −6.5 °C (−11.7 °F) per km (approximately −2 °C (−3.6 °F) per 1,000 ft).

The International Standard Atmosphere is representative of atmospheric conditions at mid latitudes. In the US this information is specified the U.S. Standard Atmosphere which is identical to the "International Standard Atmosphere" at all altitudes up to 65,000 feet above sea level.

== Standard laboratory conditions ==
Because many definitions of standard temperature and pressure differ in temperature significantly from standard laboratory temperatures (e.g. 0 °C vs. ~28 °C), reference is often made to "standard laboratory conditions" (a term deliberately chosen to be different from the term "standard conditions for temperature and pressure", despite its semantic near identity when interpreted literally). However, what is a "standard" laboratory temperature and pressure is inevitably geography-bound, given that different parts of the world differ in climate, altitude and the degree of use of heat/cooling in the workplace. For example, schools in New South Wales, Australia use 25 °C at 100 kPa for standard laboratory conditions. ASTM International has published Standard ASTM E41- Terminology Relating to Conditioning and hundreds of special conditions for particular materials and test methods. Other standards organizations also have specialized standard test conditions.

== Molar volume of a gas ==
It is as important to indicate the applicable reference conditions of temperature and pressure when stating the molar volume of a gas as it is when expressing a gas volume or volumetric flow rate. Stating the molar volume of a gas without indicating the reference conditions of temperature and pressure has very little meaning and can cause confusion.

The molar volume of gases around STP and at atmospheric pressure can be calculated with an accuracy that is usually sufficient by using the ideal gas law. The molar volume of any ideal gas may be calculated at various standard reference conditions as shown below:

- V_{m} = 8.3145 × 273.15 / 101.325 = 22.414 dm^{3}/mol at 0 °C and 101.325 kPa
- V_{m} = 8.3145 × 273.15 / 100.000 = 22.711 dm^{3}/mol at 0 °C and 100 kPa
- V_{m} = 8.3145 × 288.15 / 101.325 = 23.645 dm^{3}/mol at 15 °C and 101.325 kPa
- V_{m} = 8.3145 × 298.15 / 101.325 = 24.466 dm^{3}/mol at 25 °C and 101.325 kPa
- V_{m} = 8.3145 × 298.15 / 100.000 = 24.790 dm^{3}/mol at 25 °C and 100 kPa
- V_{m} = 10.7316 × 519.67 / 14.696 = 379.48 ft^{3}/lbmol at 60 °F and 14.696 psi (or about 0.8366 ft^{3}/gram mole)
- V_{m} = 10.7316 × 519.67 / 14.730 = 378.61 ft^{3}/lbmol at 60 °F and 14.73 psi

Technical literature can be confusing because many authors fail to explain whether they are using the ideal gas constant R, or the specific gas constant R_{s}. The relationship between the two constants is R_{s} = R / m, where m is the molecular mass of the gas.

The US Standard Atmosphere (USSA) uses 8.31432 m^{3}·Pa/(mol·K) as the value of R. However, the USSA in 1976 does recognize that this value is not consistent with the values of the Avogadro constant and the Boltzmann constant.

== See also ==
- Environmental chamber
- ISO 1 – standard reference temperature for geometric product specifications
- Reference atmospheric model
- Room temperature
- Standard sea-level conditions
- Standard state
