= Anomalous oxygen =

Anomalous oxygen is hot atomic and singly ionized oxygen believed to be present in Earth's exosphere above 500 km near the poles during their respective summers. This additional component augmenting mainly the hydrogen and helium exosphere is able to explain the unexpectedly high drag forces on satellites passing near the poles in their summers. Anomalous oxygen densities are included in the NRLMSISE-00 models of Earth's atmosphere.
