= Geneva G. Belford =

Computer scientist

- Born: May 18, 1932
- Died: March 4, 2014 (aged 81)

Geneva Grosz Belford (born May 18, 1932) was a computer scientist who worked at the University of Illinois. She worked at the University of Illinois for over 40 years and advised over 140 graduate students including Thomas M. Siebel and Charles E. Roberts.

Belford was an contributor for Britannica and worked on their article on computer science. She also co-authored a textbook on the Pascal programming language. Her papers are located at the University of Illinois Archives.

== Early life ==
Belford was born on May 18, 1932 in Washington, D.C. She attended the University of Pennsylvania and received her bachelor's degree in Mathematics. She then attended the University of Illinois and graduated in 1960 with a PhD in mathematics. Her research originally focused on chemistry and mathematics. Later on, she focused on computer science.

== Career ==
After graduating with her PhD, Belford was hired as a research associate at the University of Illinois Chemistry Department. She continued working there until she was became an assistant professor of Mathematics in 1964. Belford later became a research assistant professor with the Center for Advanced Computation in 1972. In 1976, she was promoted to a research associate professor and in 1977, she joined the Department of Computer Science. Belford was promoted to full professor in 1982 Her research involved database and distributed systems and the ILLIAC computer.

She was Professor Emerita of Computer Science and officially retired from the University of Illinois in 2000.

== Awards and recognition ==
- 1986 College of Engineering Halliburton Educational Leadership Award
- 1991 Dad’s Association Outstanding Faculty Award
- 2005 Graduate College Outstanding Mentor Award
- 2007 Mom’s Association Medallion of Honor
- 2012 CS @ ILLINOIS Distinguished Service Award

== List of publications ==
- Alsberg, P. A, et al.. Networking Research In Front Ending And Intelligent Terminals: H6000 Software Specifications
- Belford, Geneva G, and D. E. (Daniel E.) Putnam Networking research in front ending and intelligent terminals: Experimental network front end experiment plan
- Belford, Geneva G. An algorithm for fitting related sets of straight-line data
- Belford, Geneva G. Investigation of one-step methods for integro-differential equations
- Belford, Geneva G. Optimization problems in distributed data management
- Belford, Geneva G. Research In Network Data Management And Resource Sharing: Initial Mathematical Model Report
- Liu, C. L. and Belford, Geneva G. Pascal
- Putnam, D. E. (Daniel E.), David C Healy, Geneva G Belford Networking research in front ending and intelligent terminals : UNIX/ENFE experimental performance report
- Schwartz, P. M., Grapa, E., Day, J. D., Belford, G. G., Research in network data management and resource sharing: network file allocation
- Yan, Y. L., Smet, A. D., Moon, A., Manolas, A. P., Leo, J., Kim, C. K., Kaufman, K. A., Hwund, S. C., Goldstein, J. D., England, S., Cotten, P., Cho, D., Liu, J. W. S., Belford, G. G. Mutual consistency maintenance in a prototype data traffic management system
