= Standard sea-level conditions =

Physical conditions at sea level

Standard sea-level conditions (SSL), also known as sea-level standard (SLS), defines a set of atmospheric conditions for physical calculations. The term "standard sea level" is used to indicate that values of properties are to be taken to be the same as those standard at sea level, and is done to define values for use in general calculations.

== Atmospheric properties ==
At SSL some atmospheric properties are:

- Pressure, P = 101.325 kPa ⇔ 2116.2 lb_{f}/ft^{2} ⇔ 14.696 lb_{f}/in^{2} ⇔ 760 mmHg ⇔ 29.92 inHg
- Density, $\rho$ = 1.225 kg/m^{3} ⇔ 0.002377 slug/ft^{3}
- Temperature, T = 15 °C ⇔ 59 °F ⇔ 288.15 K ⇔ 518.67 °R
- Gas constant of air, R_{air} = 287.057 J/(kg·K) ⇔ 1716.59 ft·lb/sl·°R)
- Specific Weight, $\gamma$ = 12.014 N/m^{3} ⇔ 0.07647 lb_{f}/ft^{3}
- Dynamic viscosity, $\mu$ = 1.789×10^{−5} Pa·s ⇔ 3.737×10^{−7} slug/(s·ft)
- Acceleration of gravity, g_{0} = 9.807 m/s^{2} ⇔ 32.174 ft/s^{2}

== See also ==
- Sea level
- Sea level rise
- Standard temperature and pressure
- U.S. Standard Atmosphere
