= International Standard Atmosphere =

Atmospheric model

Comparison of a graph of International Standard Atmosphere temperature and pressure and approximate altitudes of various objects and successful stratospheric jumps

The International Standard Atmosphere (ISA) is a static atmospheric model of how the pressure, temperature, density, and viscosity of the Earth's atmosphere change over a wide range of altitudes or elevations. It has been established to provide a common reference for temperature and pressure and consists of tables of values at various altitudes, plus some formulas by which those values were derived. The International Organization for Standardization (ISO) publishes the ISA as an international standard, ISO 2533:1975. Other standards organizations, such as the International Civil Aviation Organization (ICAO) and the United States government, publish extensions or subsets of the same atmospheric model under their own standards-making authority.

== Description ==
The ISA mathematical model divides the atmosphere into layers with an assumed linear distribution of absolute temperature T against geopotential altitude h. The other two values (pressure P and density ρ) are computed by simultaneously solving the equations resulting from:

- the vertical pressure gradient resulting from hydrostatic balance, which relates the rate of change of pressure with geopotential altitude:

$\frac{dP}{dh} = - \rho g$, and

- the ideal gas law in molar form, which relates pressure, density, and temperature:

$$\ P = \rho R_{\rm specific}T$$

at each geopotential altitude, where g is the standard acceleration of gravity, and R_{specific} is the specific gas constant for dry air (287.0528J⋅kg^{−1}⋅K^{−1}). The solution is given by the barometric formula.

Air density must be calculated in order to solve for the pressure, and is used in calculating dynamic pressure for moving vehicles. Dynamic viscosity is an empirical function of temperature, and kinematic viscosity is calculated by dividing dynamic viscosity by the density.

Thus the standard consists of a tabulation of values at various altitudes, plus some formulas by which those values were derived. To accommodate the lowest points on Earth, the model starts at a base geopotential altitude of 610 meters (2,000 ft) below sea level, with standard temperature set at 19 °C. With a temperature lapse rate of −6.5 °C (-11.7 °F) per km (roughly −2 °C (-3.6 °F) per 1,000 ft), the table interpolates to the standard mean sea level values of 15 °C (59 °F) temperature, 101,325 pascals (14.6959 psi) (1 atm) pressure, and a density of 1.2250 kilograms per cubic meter (0.07647 lb/cu ft). The tropospheric tabulation continues to 11,000 meters (36,089 ft), where the temperature has fallen to −56.5 °C (−69.7 °F), the pressure to 22,632 pascals (3.2825 psi), and the density to 0.3639 kilograms per cubic meter (0.02272 lb/cu ft). Between 11 km and 20 km, the temperature remains constant.

Layers in the ISA Standard Atmosphere 1976
Layer	Level name	Base geopotential altitude above MSL h (m)	Base geometric altitude above MSL z (m)	Lapse rate ( °C/km)^{[a]}	Base temperature T (°C[K])	Base atmospheric pressure p (Pa)	Base atmospheric density ρ (kg/m^{3})
0	Troposphere	0	0	+6.5	+15.0 (288.15)	101,325	1.225
1	Tropopause	11,000	11,019	0.0	−56.5 (216.65)	22632	0.3639
2	Stratosphere	20,000	20,063	-1.0	−56.5 (216.65)	5474.9	0.0880
3	Stratosphere	32,000	32,162	-2.8	−44.5 (228.65)	868.02	0.0132
4	Stratopause	47,000	47,350	0.0	−2.5 (270.65)	110.91	0.0014
5	Mesosphere	51,000	51,412	+2.8	−2.5 (270.65)	66.939	0.0009
6	Mesosphere	71,000	71,802	+2.0	−58.5 (214.65)	3.9564	0.0001
7	Mesopause	86,000	84,852	—	-86.204 (186.946)	0	0

^{a} lapse rate given per kilometer of geopotential altitude (A positive lapse rate (λ > 0) means temperature decreases with height)

In the above table, geopotential altitude is calculated from a mathematical model that adjusts the altitude to include the variation of gravity with height, while geometric altitude is the standard direct vertical distance above mean sea level (MSL).

- The equation that relates the two altitudes are (where z is the geometric altitude, h is the geopotential altitude, and r_{0} = 6,356,766 m in this model):

$$\ z = \frac{r_{0} h}{r_{0} - h}$$

Note that the Lapse Rates cited in the table are given as °C per kilometer of geopotential altitude, not geometric altitude.

The ISA model is based on average conditions at mid latitudes, as determined by the ISO's TC 20/SC 6 technical committee. It has been revised from time to time since the middle of the 20th century.

=== Use at non-standard day conditions ===
The ISA models a hypothetical standard day to allow a reproducible engineering reference for calculation and testing of engine and vehicle performance at various altitudes. It does not provide a rigorous meteorological model of actual atmospheric conditions (for example, changes in barometric pressure due to wind conditions). Neither does it account for humidity effects; air is assumed to be dry and clean and of constant composition. Humidity effects are accounted for in vehicle or engine analysis by adding water vapor to the thermodynamic state of the air after obtaining the pressure and density from the standard atmosphere model.

Non-standard (hot or cold) days are modeled by adding a specified temperature delta to the standard temperature at altitude, but pressure is taken as the standard day value. Density and viscosity are recalculated at the resultant temperature and pressure using the ideal gas equation of state. Hot day, Cold day, Tropical, and Polar temperature profiles with altitude have been defined for use as performance references, such as United States Department of Defense MIL-STD-210C, and its successor MIL-HDBK-310.

== ICAO Standard Atmosphere ==
The International Civil Aviation Organization (ICAO) published their "ICAO Standard Atmosphere" as Doc 7488-CD in 1993. It has the same model as the ISA, but extends the altitude coverage to 80 kilometers (262,500 feet).

The ICAO Standard Atmosphere, like the ISA, does not contain water vapor.

Some of the values defined by ICAO are:

ICAO Standard Atmosphere
Height km & ft	Temperature °C	Pressure hPa	Lapse rate °C/1000 ft	Lapse rate C/1000 m
0 km MSL	15.0	1013.25	+1.98 (tropospheric)	+6.5 (tropospheric)
11 km 36 000 ft	−56.5	226.00	0.00 (stratospheric)	0.00 (stratospheric)
20 km 65 000 ft	−56.5	54.70	-0.3 (stratospheric)	-0.1 (stratospheric)
32 km 105 000 ft	−44.5	8.68		

Aviation standards and flying rules are based on the International Standard Atmosphere. Airspeed indicators are calibrated on the assumption that they are operating at sea level in the International Standard Atmosphere where the air density is 1.225 kg/m^{3}.

Physical properties of the ICAO Standard Atmosphere are:

Physical properties of the ICAO Standard Atmosphere
Parameter	Value
Density	1.225 kg m^{−3}
Kinematic viscosity	1.4607 × 10^{−5} m^{2} s^{−1}
Dynamic viscosity	1.7894 × 10^{−5} kg m^{−1} s^{−1}
Molar volume	2.3645 × 10^{−2} m^{3} mol^{−1}
Molecular weight	28.966
Thermal conductivity	2.5339 × 10^{−2} W m^{−1} K^{−1}
Mean free path	6.6317 × 10^{−8} m
Collision frequency	6.9204 × 10^{9} s^{−1}
Particle speed	4.5894 × 10^{2} m s^{−1}
Number density	2.5475 × 10^{25} m^{−3}

== Other standard atmospheres ==
The U.S. Standard Atmosphere is a set of models that define values for atmospheric temperature, density, pressure and other properties over a wide range of altitudes. The first model, based on an existing international standard, was published in 1958 by the U.S. Committee on Extension to the Standard Atmosphere, and was updated in 1962, 1966, and 1976. The U.S. Standard Atmosphere, International Standard Atmosphere and WMO (World Meteorological Organization) standard atmospheres are the same as the ISO International Standard Atmosphere for altitudes up to 32 km.

NRLMSISE-00 is a newer model of the Earth's atmosphere from ground to space, developed by the US Naval Research Laboratory taking actual satellite drag data into account. A primary use of this model is to aid predictions of satellite orbital decay due to atmospheric drag. The COSPAR International Reference Atmosphere (CIRA) 2012 and the ISO 14222 Earth Atmosphere Density standard both recommend NRLMSISE-00 for composition uses.

JB2008 is a newer model of the Earth's atmosphere from 120 km to 2000 km, developed by the US Air Force Space Command and Space Environment Technologies taking into account realistic solar irradiances and time evolution of geomagnetic storms. It is most useful for calculating satellite orbital decay due to atmospheric drag. Both CIRA 2012 and ISO 14222 recommend JB2008 for mass density in drag uses.

== See also ==
- Acronyms and abbreviations in avionics
- Density of air
- Jet standard atmosphere
