= Reference atmospheric model =

A reference atmospheric model describes how the ideal gas properties (namely: pressure, temperature, density, and molecular weight) of an atmosphere change, primarily as a function of altitude, and sometimes also as a function of latitude, day of year, etc. A static atmospheric model has a more limited domain, excluding time. A standard atmosphere is defined by the World Meteorological Organization as "a hypothetical vertical distribution of atmospheric temperature, pressure and density which, by international agreement, is roughly representative of year-round, midlatitude conditions."

Typical usages are as a basis for pressure altimeter calibrations, aircraft performance calculations, aircraft and rocket design, ballistic tables, and meteorological diagrams."

For example, the U.S. Standard Atmosphere derives the values for air temperature, pressure, and mass density, as a function of altitude above sea level.

Other static atmospheric models may have other outputs, or depend on inputs besides altitude.

== Basic assumptions ==
The gas which comprises an atmosphere is usually assumed to be an ideal gas, which is to say:

$$\rho = \frac{M P}{R T}$$

Where ρ is mass density, M is average molecular weight, P is pressure, T is temperature, and R is the ideal gas constant.

The gas is held in place by so-called "hydrostatic" forces. That is to say, for a particular layer of gas at some altitude: the downward (towards the planet) force of its weight, the downward force exerted by pressure in the layer above it, and the upward force exerted by pressure in the layer below, all sum to zero. Mathematically this is:

$$P A - (P + \text{d}P) A - (\rho A \text{d}h) g_0 = 0 \,$$

$$\text{d}P = - g_0 \rho \text{d}h \,$$

Finally, these variables describing the system do not change with time; i.e. it is a static system.

g_0, gravitational acceleration is used here as a constant, with same value as standard gravity (average acceleration due to gravity on the surface of the Earth or other big body). For the basis of simplicity it doesn't vary with latitude, altitude or location. The variation due to all these factors is about 1% up to 50km. More complex models account for these variations.

== Some examples ==
Depending on the model, some gas properties may be treated as constant with respect to altitude.

=== Ocean example ===
If the density of a gas is persistent, then it isn't really behaving like a gas. Instead it is behaving like an incompressible fluid, or liquid, and this situation looks more like an ocean. Assuming density is constant, then a graph of pressure vs altitude will have a retained slope, since the weight of the ocean overhead is directly proportional to its depth.

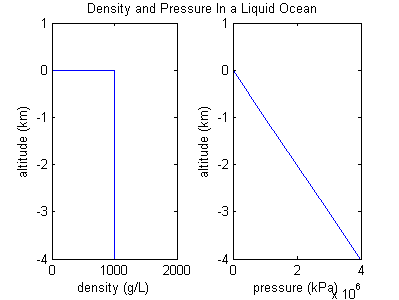

=== Isothermal-barotropic approximation and scale height ===
This atmospheric model assumes both molecular weight and temperature are constant over a wide range of altitude. Such a model may be called isothermal (constant temperature). Inserting constant molecular weight and constant temperature into the equation for the ideal gas law produces the result that density and pressure, the two remaining variables, depend only on each other. For this reason, this model may also be called barotropic (density depends only on pressure).

For the isothermal-barotropic model, density and pressure turn out to be exponential functions of altitude. The increase in altitude necessary for P or ρ to drop to 1/e of its initial value is called the scale height:

$$H = \frac{R T}{M g_0}$$

where R is the ideal gas constant, T is temperature, M is average molecular weight, and g_{0} is the gravitational acceleration at the planet's surface. Using the values T=273 K and M=29 g/mol as characteristic of the Earth's atmosphere, H = RT/Mg = (8.315*273)/(29*9.8) = 7.99, or about 8 km, which coincidentally is approximate height of Mt. Everest.

For an isothermal atmosphere, $(1-\frac{1}{e})$ or about 63% of the total mass of the atmosphere exists between the planet's surface and one scale height. (The total air mass below a certain altitude is calculated by integrating over the density function.)

For the ocean example there was a sharp transition in density at the top or "surface" of the ocean. However, for atmospheres made of gas there is no equivalent sharp transition or edge. Gas atmospheres simply get less and less dense until they're so thin that they're space.

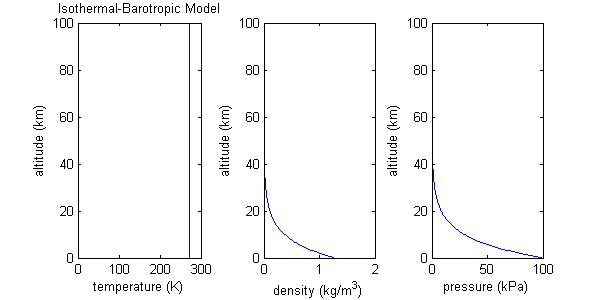

=== The U.S. Standard Atmosphere ===
The U.S. Standard Atmosphere model starts with many of the same assumptions as the isothermal-barotropic model, including ideal gas behavior, and constant molecular weight, but it differs by defining a more realistic temperature function, consisting of eight data points connected by straight lines; i.e. regions of constant temperature gradient. (See graph.) Of course the real atmosphere does not have a temperature distribution with this exact shape. The temperature function is an approximation. Values for pressure and density are then calculated based on this temperature function, and the constant temperature gradients help to make some of the maths easier.

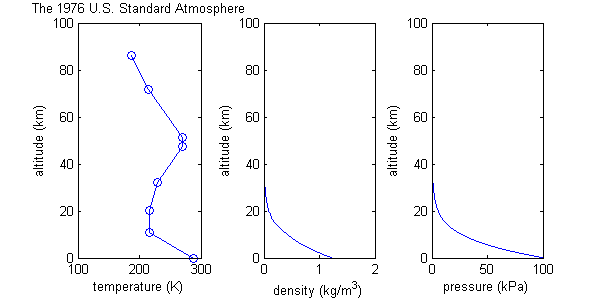

=== NASA Global Reference Atmospheric Model ===
The NASA Earth Global Reference Atmospheric Model (Earth-GRAM) was developed by the Marshall Space Flight Center to provide a design reference atmosphere that, unlike the standard atmospheres, allows for geographical variability, a wide range of altitudes (surface to orbital altitudes), and different months and times of day. It can also simulate spatial and temporal perturbations in atmospheric parameters due to turbulence and other atmospheric perturbation phenomena. It is available in computer code written in Fortran. The GRAM series also includes atmospheric models for the planets Venus, Mars and Neptune and the Saturnian moon, Titan.

== Geopotential altitude ==
Gravitational acceleration, g(z), decreases with altitude since moving up means moving away from the planet's center.

$$g(z) = \frac{G m_e}{(r_e + z)^2}$$

This problem of decreasing g can be dealt with by defining a transformation from real geometric altitude z to an abstraction called "geopotential altitude" h, defined:

$$h = \frac{r_e z}{r_e + z}$$

h has the property

$\frac{}{} g(z) dz = g_0 dh$ where $g_0 = g(0) = \frac{G m_e}{{r_e}^2}$

Which basically says the amount of work done lifting a test mass m to height z through an atmosphere where gravity decreases with altitude, is the same as the amount of work done lifting that same mass to a height h through an atmosphere where g magically remains equal to g0, its value at sea level.

This geopotential altitude h is then used instead of geometric altitude z in the hydrostatic equations.

== Common models ==
- COSPAR International Reference Atmosphere
- International Standard Atmosphere
- Jacchia Reference Atmosphere, an older model still commonly used in spacecraft dynamics
- Jet standard atmosphere
- NRLMSISE-00 is a recent model from NRL often used in the atmospheric sciences
- US Standard Atmosphere

== See also ==
- Standard temperature and pressure
- Upper-atmospheric models
