= Luigi Giuseppe Jacchia =

Italian and American physicist (1910–1996)

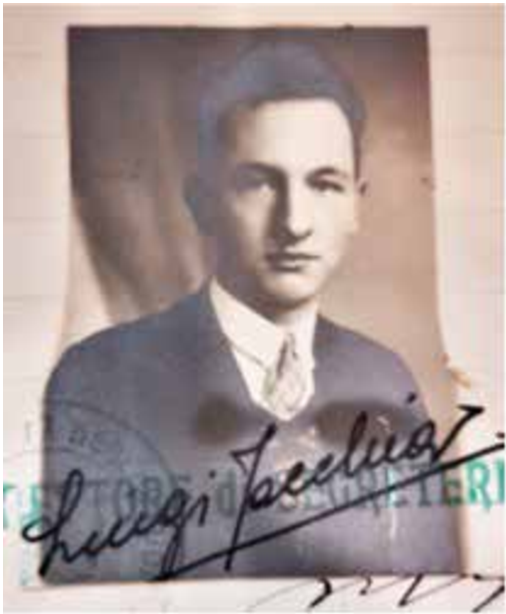
- Jacchia in 1928 (aged 18)
- Born: June 4, 1910; Trieste, Austro-Hungarian Empire
- Died: May 8, 1996 (aged 85); Cambridge, Massachusetts, U.S.
- Occupations: Physicist; astronomer
- Known for: Jacchia Reference Atmosphere
- Awards: Hodgkins Medal (1980)

Academic background
- Education: University of Bologna (PhD)
- Thesis: Study of the Debye effect in castor oil (1932)

Academic work
- Institutions: Harvard College Observatory; Massachusetts Institute of Technology; Smithsonian Astrophysical Observatory
- Main interests: Atmospheric physics

Luigi Giuseppe Jacchia (June 4, 1910 – May 8, 1996) was an Italian and naturalized-American physicist and astronomer at the Harvard College Observatory and the Smithsonian Astrophysical Observatory, where he developed the Jacchia Reference Atmosphere model. In 1980, he won the Hodgkins Medal for his discovery that solar weather causes expansion of the thermosphere and increases the drag on satellites in low Earth orbit.

== Early life and education ==
Jacchia was born in 1910 in Trieste, then Austro-Hungary, to an affluent family of merchants. His father was Italian-Jewish, and his mother was an Italian Catholic who later converted. In Trieste, he attended primary school in German and later studied in Weimar Germany before returning to Italy to complete secondary school in Udine. At the lyceum, he initially studied engineering until discovering an interest in astronomy. He was mentored by Guido Horn d'Arturo, who invited him to join the Observatory of Bologna.

He attended the University of Bologna, earning a doctorate in physics in 1932. His thesis, written when he was twenty-two, characterized the Debye effect in oil.

== Career ==
As a student in Bologna between 1929 and 1931, Jacchia worked in astronomy and meteorology research at the Observatory of Bologna. After graduating, he became an assistant at the observatory, part of the National Institute for Astrophysics, where he studied variable stars. He taught at the University of Bologna for seven years.

After the declaration of racial laws by the fascist government of Italy in 1938, Jacchia lost his position at the observatory. He fled Italy in 1939 and joined the Harvard College Observatory as a research associate in Cambridge, Massachusetts. Once in the United States, he supported the Allied forces during World War II by working as a scientific consultant and linguist for the Language Broadcasting and Monitoring Service at the U.S. Office of War Information.

He returned to Harvard after the war to conduct research on atmospheric dynamics and later became a research associate at the Massachusetts Institute of Technology (MIT). Jacchia collaborated with physicists such as Fred Lawrence Whipple, Zdeněk Kopal, Franco Verniani, Leon Campbell, and Jack William Slowey at Harvard and MIT.

In 1956, Whipple invited Jacchia to join the Smithsonian Astrophysical Observatory (SAO). There, he analyzed orbit telemetry data from NASA's Explorer 8 satellite collected by SAO's global network of Baker-Nunn cameras to analyze atmospheric perturbations on its orbital trajectory. In 1964, he used this data to characterize diurnal density fluctuations in the thermosphere caused by the Sun. Along with Verniani, he also discovered the effect of sunspots and solar flares on atmospheric heating and the resulting increase of atmospheric drag for spacecraft in low-Earth orbit. His work helped explain the rapid re-entry of Skylab in 1979 after a period of high solar activity. The SAO described this finding as "one of the major milestones in space physics...often compared to the discovery of the Van Allen radiation belts" and awarded him the Hodgkins Medal in 1980.

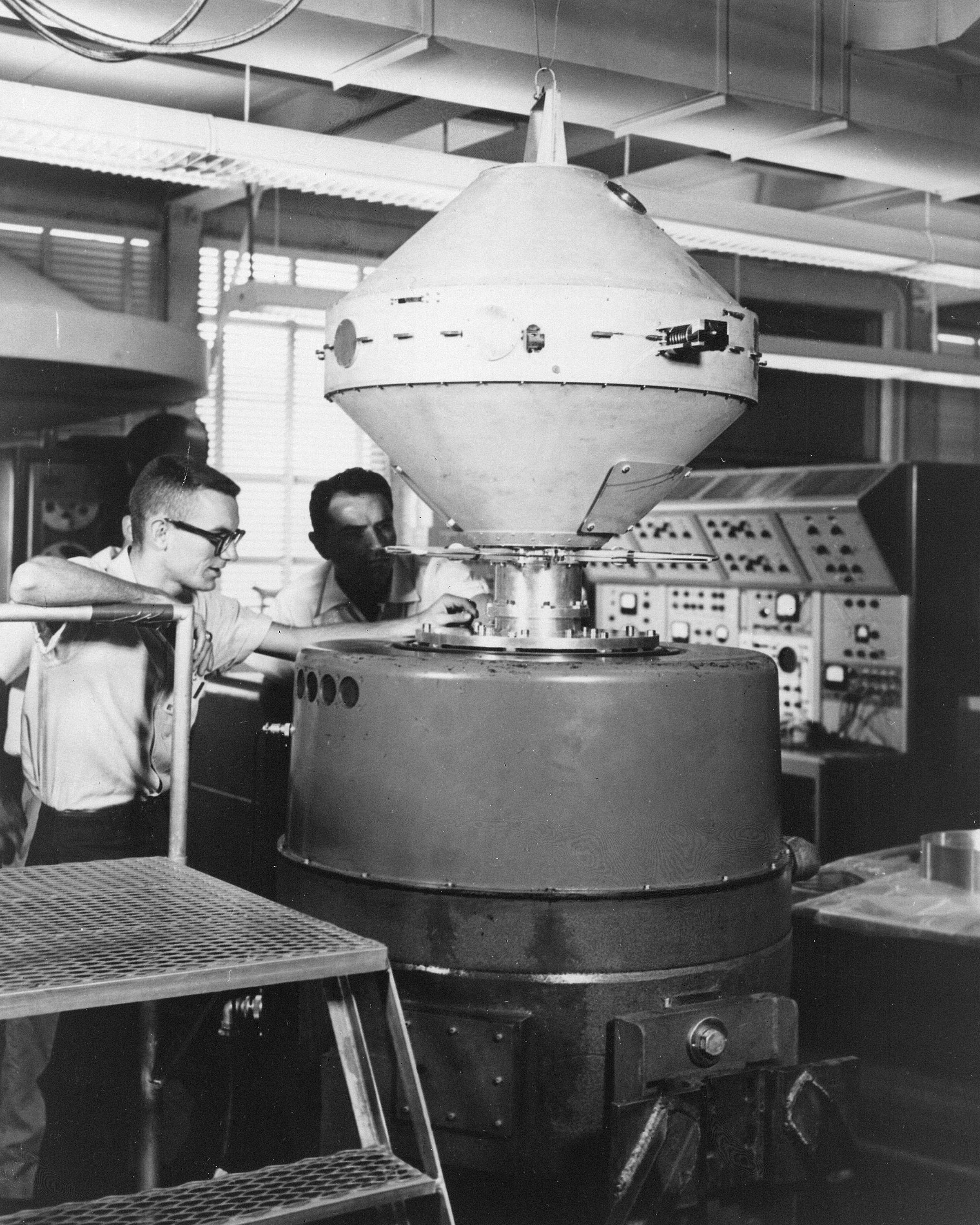
NASA Explorer 8

Jacchia wrote over 200 scientific papers on topics ranging from atmospheric physics, comets, and meteors. He was a member of the International Astronomical Union (IAU), American Astronomical Society (AAS), International Association of Geodesy (IAG), and the Committee on Space Research (COSPAR). He was also involved in the planning of the International Geophysical Year (1957–1958).

He died in 1996 after a long illness, aged 85.

== Personal life ==
Jacchia never married. He was a polyglot, speaking over twelve languages. He witnessed the 1972 Great Daylight Fireball.

== Awards ==
- Asteroid 2079 Jacchia was named after him by the IAU (1976)
- Hodgkins Medal (1980)

== Publications ==
- The story of variable stars, Leon Campbell and Luigi Jacchia (1941) ISBN 978-1494052843
