= COSPAR International Reference Atmosphere =

Empirical model of Earth's atmosphere

The COSPAR International Reference Atmosphere (CIRA) is an empirical model of the atmosphere of Earth. It consists of a set of tables of average air pressures, altitudes and temperatures. The CIRA models are developed by the Committee on Space Research (COSPAR) and have been important for the planning of spaceflight.

== History ==
Orbit determinations and flight planning of the very first satellites proved to be more complicated than expected due to a lack of knowledge on the upper atmosphere. The Committee on Space Research therefore set up a long lasting special project to elaborate a reference model of the most important parameters of the upper atmosphere. The first CIRA appeared 1961 as "CIRA1961". It was a set of tables reconsidered year for year by the Task Group on the CIRA originally chaired by Hildegard Kallmann-Bijl.

== Today ==
Previously, "CIRA 1986" or CIRA-86 covered the height range up to 120 km as a set of tables. In the thermosphere, above about 100 km, CIRA-86 is identical to the more complicated NASA MSIS-86 model. All models are now available on the Web. The task group takes account of more recent data at bi-annual meetings in connection to COSPAR meeting.

The most recent version is the "CIRA 2014".
