= NRLMSISE-00 =

Atmospheric model of Earth

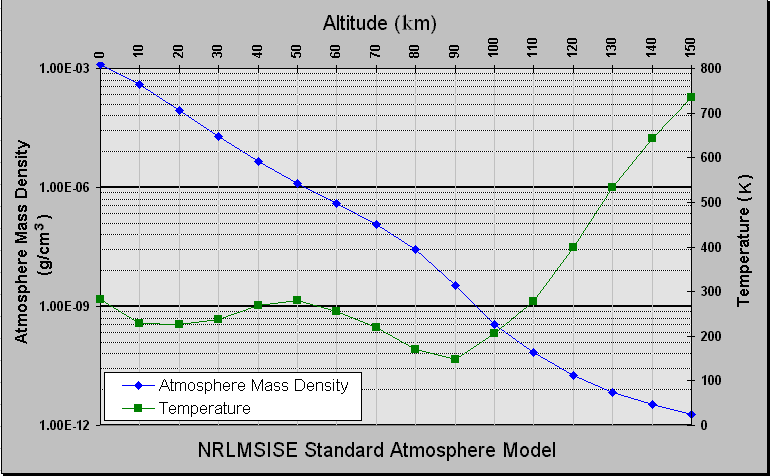
NRLMSISE output

NRLMSISE-00 is an empirical, global reference atmospheric model of the Earth from ground to space. It models the temperatures and densities of the atmosphere's components. A primary use of this model is to aid predictions of satellite orbital decay due to atmospheric drag. This model has also been used by astronomers to calculate the mass of air between telescopes and laser beams in order to assess the impact of laser guide stars on the non-lasing telescopes.

== Development ==
The model, developed by Mike Picone, Alan Hedin, and Doug Drob, is based on the earlier models MSIS-86 and MSISE-90, but updated with actual satellite drag data. It also predicts anomalous oxygen.

NRL stands for the US Naval Research Laboratory. MSIS stands for mass spectrometer and incoherent scatter radar, the two primary data sources for development of earlier versions of the model. E indicates that the model extends from the ground through exosphere and 00 is the year of release.

Over the years since introduction, NRLMSISE-00 has become the standard for international space research.

== Input and output ==
The inputs for the model are:

- Year and day
- Time of day
- Geodetic altitude from 0 to 1,000 km
- Geodetic latitude
- Geodetic longitude
- Daily F10.7 solar flux for previous day
- 81-day average of F10.7 solar flux
- Daily (or 3-hourly for "storm mode") Ap geomagnetic index
- 25 flags which turn on and off different parts of the calculation

The outputs of the model are:

- Helium number density
- Oxygen (O) number density
- Nitrogen (N_{2}) number density
- Oxygen (O_{2}) number density
- Argon (Ar) number density
- Total mass density
- Hydrogen (H) number density
- Nitrogen (N) number density
- Anomalous oxygen number density
- Exospheric temperature
- Temperature at altitude

== See also ==
- Static atmospheric model
- International Standard Atmosphere links to 1976 standard.
