= 486958 Arrokoth =

Kuiper belt object

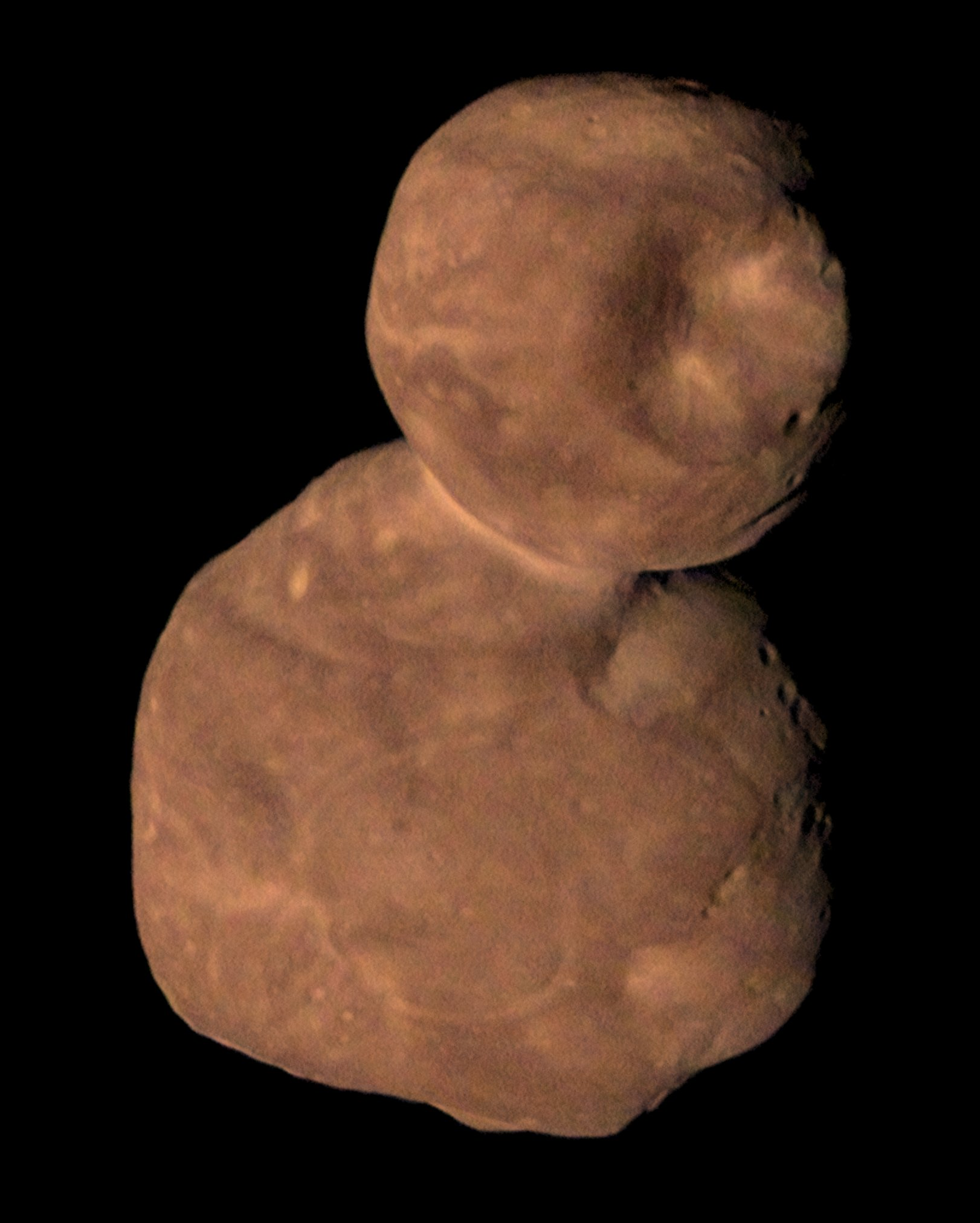
- Near natural color image of Arrokoth captured by the New Horizons spacecraft. The smaller lobe, Weeyo, is at the top of the image, attached to the larger lobe, Wenu, which is at the bottom.

Discovery
- Discovered by: Marc W. Buie; New Horizons KBO Search
- Discovery site: Hubble Space Telescope
- Discovery date: 26 June 2014

Designations
- Pronunciation: /ˈærəkɒθ/
- Named after: Powhatan word arrokoth, glossed 'sky' but probably meaning 'cloud'
- Alternative designations: (486958) 2014 MU_{69}; Ultima Thule (unofficial); 1110113Y; PT1
- Minor planet category: TNO; classical (cold); distant

Orbital characteristics (barycentric) (Note: These orbital elements are expressed in terms of the Solar System Barycenter (SSB) as the frame of reference. Due to planetary perturbations, the Sun revolves around the SSB at non-negligible distances, so heliocentric-frame orbital elements and distances (such as those given in JPL's Small-Body Database) can vary on short timescales.)
- Epoch 21 November 2025 (JD 2461000.5)
- Uncertainty parameter 4
- Observation arc: 4.11 yr (1,500 days)
- Aphelion: 45.903 AU
- Perihelion: 42.559 AU
- Semi-major axis: 44.231 AU
- Eccentricity: 0.0378
- Orbital period (sidereal): 293.97 yr
- Mean anomaly: 315.242°
- Mean motion: 0° 0^{m} 12.07^{s} / day
- Inclination: 2.450°
- Longitude of ascending node: 159.045°
- Argument of perihelion: 183.861°

Physical characteristics
- Dimensions: Overall best fit: 34.546 × 19.838 × 13.822 km; Wenu: 20.139 × 19.838 × 13.726 km; Weeyo: 15.041 × 14.378 × 13.625 km
- Mean diameter: Overall volume equivalent: 19.896 km; Wenu: 17.349 km; Weeyo: 13.845 km
- Mass: ~7.485×10^{14} kg (nominal density)
- Mean density: ~0.235 g/cm^{3} (nominal); 1-sigma range: 0.155–0.600 g/cm^{3}
- Equatorial surface gravity: ~0.0001 g (~0.001 m/s^{2})
- Synodic rotation period: 15.9380±0.0005 h
- Axial tilt: 100.39° wrt orbit
- North pole right ascension: 319.37°
- North pole declination: −25.588°
- Geometric albedo: 0.21+0.05 −0.04 (geometric); 0.062±0.015 (Bond)
Surface temp.	min	mean	max
(approx)	29 K	42 K	60 K
- Spectral type: V−I = 1.35; G−I = 1.42±0.14; G−R = 0.95±0.14
- Apparent magnitude: 26.6
- Absolute magnitude (H): 10.4 (V-band); 11.1

486958 Arrokoth (provisional designation 2014 MU_{69}; formerly nicknamed Ultima Thule (Note: Thule is classically pronounced /ˈθjuːliː/ THEW-lee. The New Horizons team used this pronunciation alongside the pseudo-Latin pronunciation /ˈtuːleɪ/ TOO-lay and a hybrid pronunciation /ˈtuːliː/ TOO-lee.)) is a small, icy Kuiper belt object orbiting the Sun beyond Neptune and Pluto. It became the farthest object in the Solar System visited by a spacecraft when the NASA space probe New Horizons flew past it on 1 January 2019. Arrokoth was discovered on 26 June 2014 by astronomer Marc Buie and the New Horizons Search Team, who had been using the Hubble Space Telescope to find Kuiper belt objects that New Horizons could visit.

Arrokoth is a contact binary—a "snowman"-shaped object composed of two lobes connected by a narrow neck of material. The lobes of Arrokoth, named Wenu and Weeyo, are believed to be former planetesimals that once formed a binary system, but gently merged. Wenu and Weeyo have flattened shapes consisting of distinct mounds, which indicate that they formed from a collection of smaller planetesimals 4.5 billion years ago. The surface of Arrokoth is tinted red by tholins and shows little cratering, which suggests that it has undergone little change since its formation. The primitive nature of Arrokoth is supported by its nearly circular and low-inclination orbit around the Sun, which suggests that it has never been disturbed by the gravitational influence of the planets.

== Name ==
When Arrokoth was first observed by the Hubble Space Telescope in 2014, it was designated 1110113Y in the context of the telescope's search for Kuiper belt objects, and was nicknamed "11" for short. Its existence as a potential target of the New Horizons probe was announced by NASA in October 2014 and it was unofficially designated as "Potential Target 1", or PT1. Its official provisional designation, 2014 MU_{69}, was assigned by the Minor Planet Center in March 2015, after sufficient orbital information had been gathered. The provisional designation indicates that Arrokoth was the 1745th minor planet to be assigned a provisional designation during the second half of June 2014. After further observations refining its orbit, it was given the permanent minor planet number 486958 on 12 March 2017.

=== Ultima Thule ===
Before the flyby on 1 January 2019, NASA invited suggestions from the public on a nickname to be used for the object. One of the choices, Ultima Thule, was selected on 13 March 2018. Thule (Ancient Greek: Θούλη, Thoúlē) is the northernmost location mentioned in ancient Greek and Roman literature and cartography, while in classical and medieval literature ultima Thule (Latin for 'farthermost Thule') acquired a metaphorical meaning of any distant place located beyond the "borders of the known world". Once it was determined that the body was a contact binary, the New Horizons team nicknamed the larger lobe "Ultima" and the smaller lobe "Thule". They are now formally named "Wenu" and "Weeyo", respectively.

Following the selection of the nickname, it was criticized by a Newsweek columnist because of the use of "Thule" by 19th-century racists as the mythical homeland of the Aryan race. The New York Times, crediting Newsweek, quoted several scientists and historians who expressed being unhappy about the name's connection to the Nazi Party. In November 2019, the International Astronomical Union (IAU) announced the object's permanent official name, Arrokoth.

=== Arrokoth ===
The name Arrokoth was chosen by the New Horizons team to represent the Powhatan people indigenous to the Tidewater region of Virginia and Maryland in the eastern United States. The Hubble Space Telescope and the Johns Hopkins University Applied Physics Laboratory, which were prominently involved in Arrokoth's discovery, were both operated from the Tidewater region of Maryland.

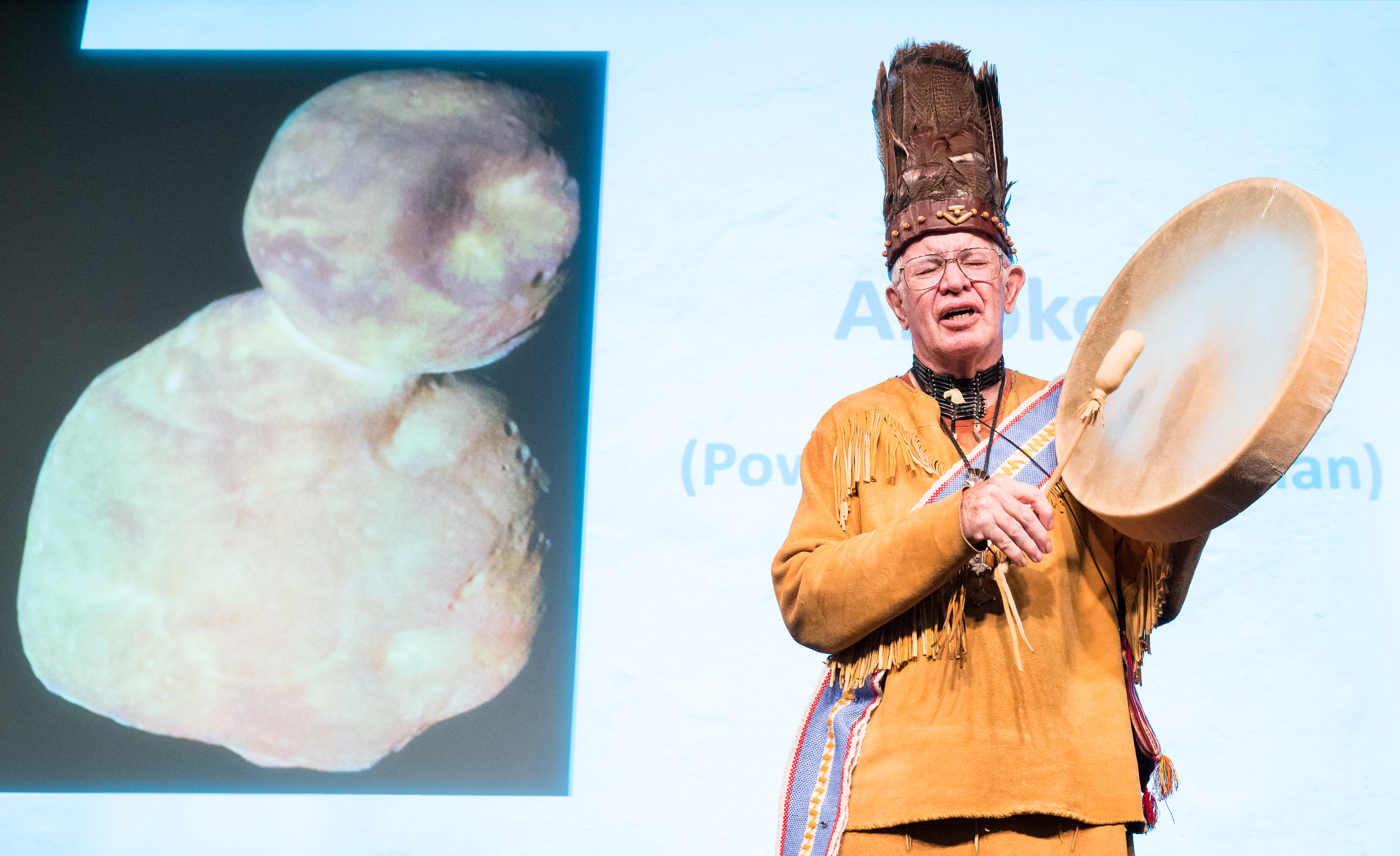
Pamunkey tribal elder Reverend Nick Miles commencing the naming ceremony for Arrokoth

With the permission of the elders of the Pamunkey Indian Tribe of the Powhatan nation, the name Arrokoth was proposed to the IAU and formally announced by the New Horizons team in a ceremony held at the NASA Headquarters in the District of Columbia on 12 November 2019. Prior to the ceremony, the name was accepted by the IAU's Minor Planet Center on 8 November, and the New Horizons team's naming citation was published in a Minor Planet Circular on 12 November.

The Powhatan language became extinct in the late 18th century and little was recorded of it. In an old word list, arrokoth is glossed as 'sky', and this was the meaning intended by the New Horizons team, but it would seem that it actually meant 'cloud'. (Note: The only record of the word was collected in 1610–1611 by English writer William Strachey, who had a decent ear but bad handwriting, and scholars since have had considerable difficulty reading his notes. The meanings of the words are also often uncertain, as Strachey and the Powhatan had no language in common. Siebert (1975: p. 324) used comparison with other Algonquian languages to interpret Strachey's handwriting, and deciphers two relevant transcriptions as ⟨arrokoth⟩ 'sky' and ⟨arrahgwotuwss⟩ 'clouds'. He reconstructs these as the word /aːrahkwat/ 'cloud' and its plural /aːrahkwatas/ 'clouds' (compare Ojibwa /aːnakkwat/ 'cloud'), from the Proto-Algonquian *aːlaxkwatwi 'it is a cloud, it is cloudy'. Given that the first vowel is long (/aː/), that syllable would have been stressed in Powhatan, so the name is approximatable in English as ARR-o-koth.)

== Shape ==
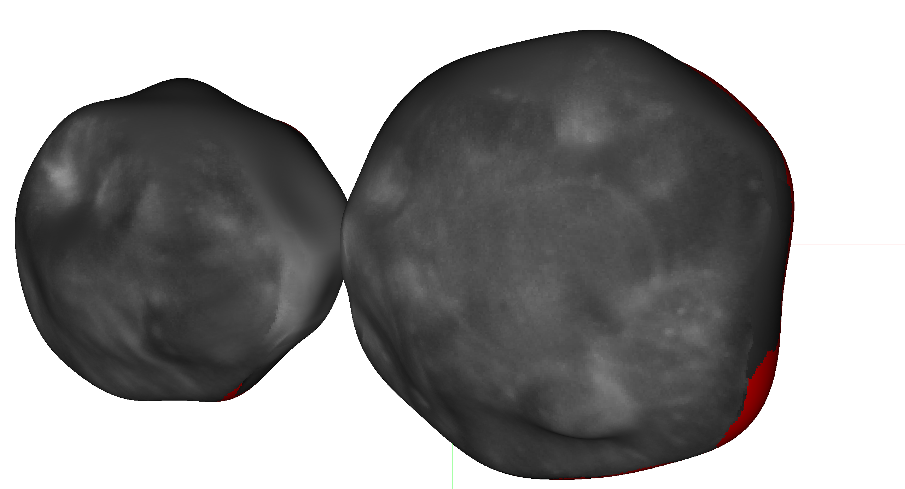
Shape model of Arrokoth constructed from New Horizons imagery as of 2024, viewed from the rotational south pole.

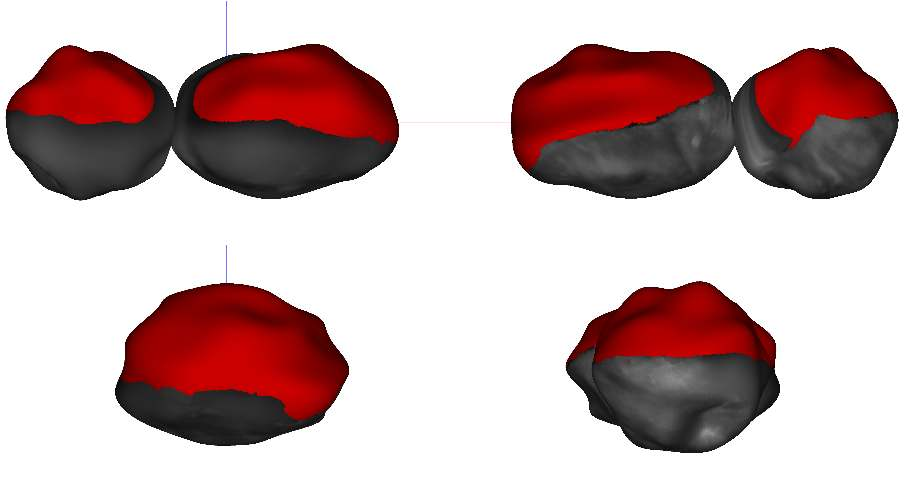
Shape model of Arrokoth constructed from New Horizons imagery as of 2024, viewed from the equator. The model's rotational north pole points up. Red areas show regions that were not well-imaged by New Horizons.

Arrokoth is a contact binary consisting of two hexagonally-shaped lobes attached by a narrow neck or waist, which is encircled by a bright band named Akasa Linea. The lobes were likely once two objects that later merged in a slow collision. The larger lobe, formally named Wenu Lobus, is slightly flattened and measures about 20.1 km (12.5 mi) across its longest axis, while the smaller lobe, Weeyo Lobus, is roughly spherical and measures about 15.0 km (9.3 mi) across its longest axis. Based on shape models of Arrokoth constructed from images taken by the New Horizons spacecraft, the dimensions of Wenu are approximately 20.1 km × 19.8 km × 13.7 km (12.5 mi × 12.3 mi × 8.5 mi) while the dimensions of Weeyo are approximately 15.0 km × 14.4 km × 13.6 km (9.3 mi × 8.9 mi × 8.5 mi). Wenu's volume is nearly exactly twice that of Weeyo. As a whole, Arrokoth is 34.5 km (21.4 mi) across its longest axis and is about 13.8 km (8.6 mi) thick.

The longest axes of both lobes are nearly aligned with each other and to the rotational axis, which is situated between them. This near-parallel alignment of the lobes suggests that they were mutually locked to each other, likely due to tidal forces, before merging. The alignment of the lobes supports the idea that the two had individually formed from the coalescence of a cloud of icy particles.

Prior to the New Horizons flyby of Arrokoth, stellar occultations by Arrokoth had provided evidence for its bilobate shape. The first detailed image of Arrokoth confirmed its double-lobed appearance and was described as a "snowman" by Alan Stern, as the lobes appeared distinctively spherical. In February 2019, one month after the New Horizons flyby, scientists proposed that Arrokoth was extremely flattened, based on New Horizons images of Arrokoth occulting background stars after its closest approach. However, a 2024 reanalysis of New Horizons imagery found that Arrokoth was not as flattened as previously thought.

== Geology ==
=== Spectra and surface ===
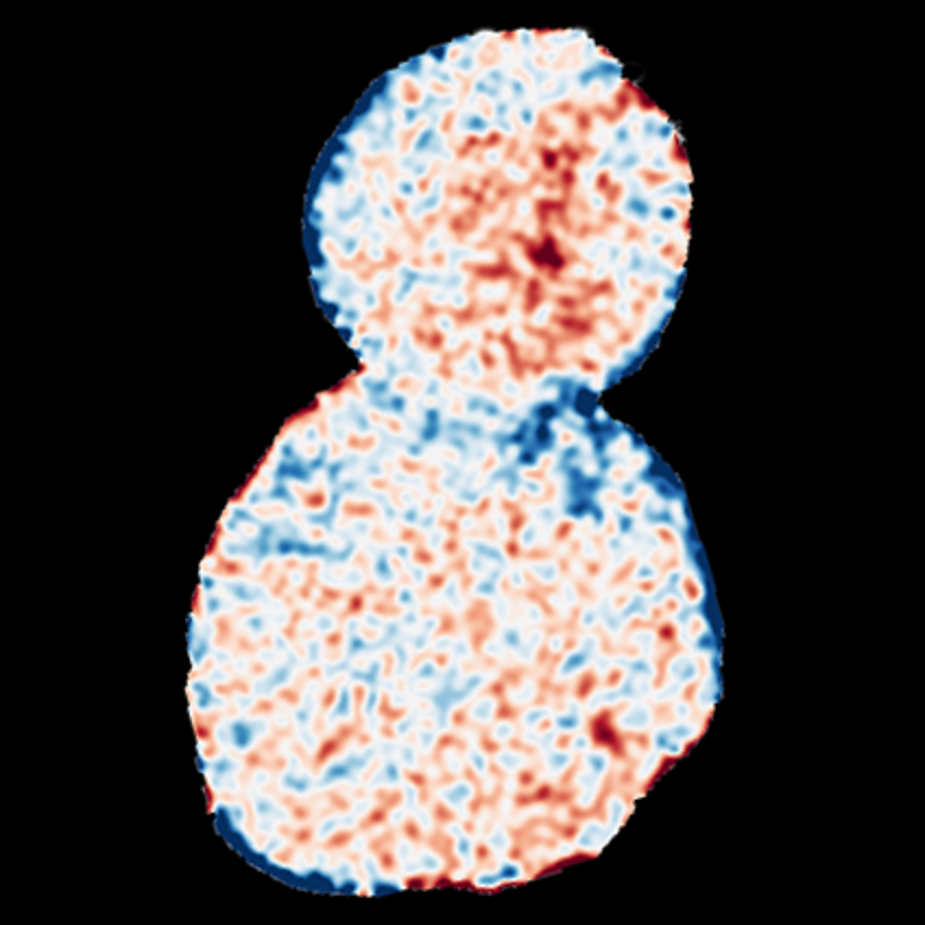
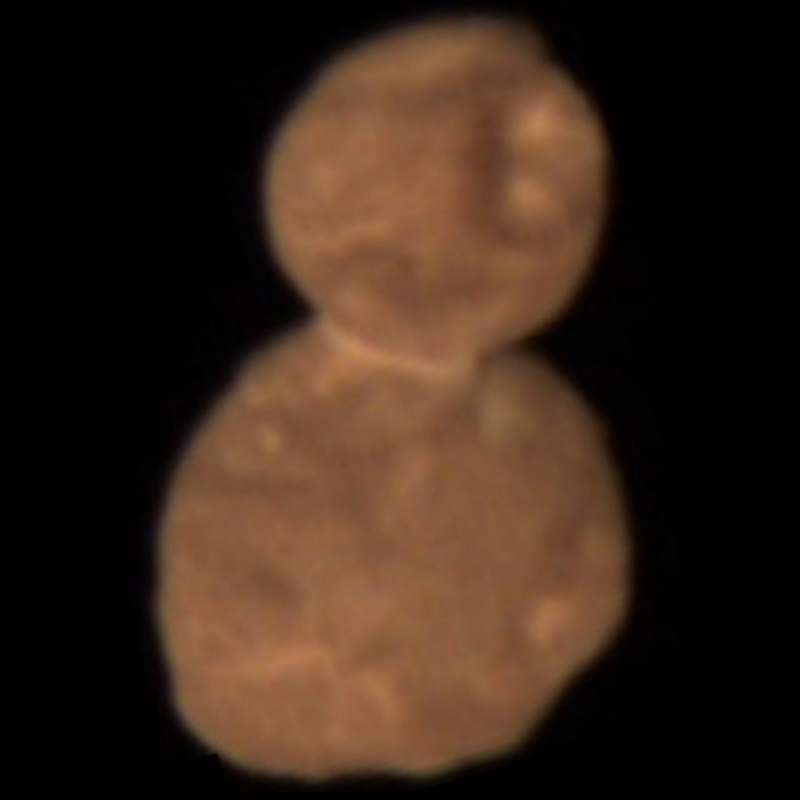
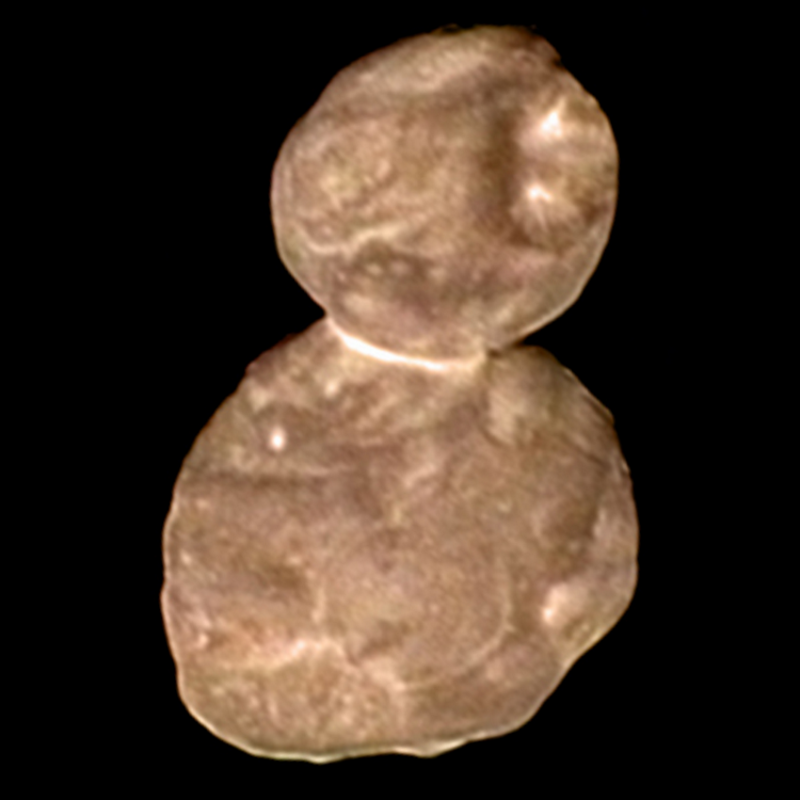
MVIC color and spectral images of Arrokoth, showing subtle color variations across its surface. The third image is the same MVIC color image superimposed on the higher resolution black and white LORRI image. (Note: Composite of black and while and color photographs taken respectively by the LORRI and MVIC instruments aboard New Horizons on 1 January 2019.)

Measurements of Arrokoth's absorption spectrum by New Horizons's LEISA spectrometer show that Arrokoth's spectrum exhibits a strong red spectral slope extending from red to infrared wavelengths at 1.2–2.5 μm. Spectral measurements from LEISA revealed the presence of methanol and complex organic compounds on the surface of Arrokoth, but no evidence of water ice. One particular absorption band in Arrokoth's spectrum at 1.8 μm indicates that these organic compounds are sulfur-rich. Given the abundance of methanol on Arrokoth's surface, it is predicted that formaldehyde-based compounds resulting from irradiation should also be present, albeit in the form of complex macromolecules. Arrokoth's spectrum shares similarities with that of 2002 VE_{95} and the centaur 5145 Pholus, which also display strong red spectral slopes along with signs of methanol present on their surfaces.

Preliminary observations by the Hubble Space Telescope in 2016 revealed that Arrokoth has a red coloration, similar to other Kuiper belt objects and centaurs like Pholus. Arrokoth's color is redder than that of Pluto, thus it belongs to the "ultra red" population of cold classical Kuiper belt objects. The red coloration of Arrokoth is caused by the presence of a mix of complex organic compounds called tholins, which are produced from the photolysis of various simple organic and volatile compounds by cosmic rays and ultraviolet solar radiation. The presence of sulfur-rich tholins on Arrokoth's surface implies that volatiles such as methane, ammonia, and hydrogen sulfide were once present on Arrokoth, but were quickly lost due to Arrokoth's small mass. However, less volatile materials such as methanol, acetylene, ethane, and hydrogen cyanide could be retained over a longer period of time, and may likely account for the reddening and production of tholins on Arrokoth. The photoionization of organic compounds and volatiles on Arrokoth was also thought to produce hydrogen gas that would interact with the solar wind, though New Horizons's SWAP and PEPSSI instruments did not detect any signature of solar wind interaction around Arrokoth.

From color and spectral measurements of Arrokoth, the surface displays subtle color variation among its surface features. Spectral images of Arrokoth show that the Akasa (neck) region and lineation features appear less red compared to the central region of the smaller lobe Weeyo. The larger lobe Wenu also displays redder regions, informally known as "thumbprints" by the New Horizons team. The thumbprint features are located near Wenu's limb. The surface albedo or reflectivity of Arrokoth varies from 5 percent to 12 percent due to various bright features on its surface. Its overall geometric albedo, the quantity of reflected light in visible spectrum, is measured at 21 percent, typical for most Kuiper belt objects. The overall Bond albedo (the quantity of reflected light of any wavelength) of Arrokoth is measured at 6.3 percent.

=== Craters ===
The surface of Arrokoth is lightly cratered and smooth in appearance. Arrokoth's surface has few small craters (from 1 km (0.62 mi) in size to the limits of photographic resolution), implying a paucity of impacts throughout its history. The occurrence of impact events in the Kuiper belt is thought to be uncommon, with a very low impact rate over the course of one billion years. Due to the slower orbital speeds of Kuiper belt objects, the speed of objects impacting Arrokoth is expected to be low, with typical impact speeds around 300 m/s (980 ft/s). At such slow impact speeds, large craters on Arrokoth are expected to be rare. With a low frequency of impact events along with the slow speeds of impacts, Arrokoth's surface would remain preserved since its formation. The preserved surface of Arrokoth could possibly give hints to its formation process, as well as signs of accreted material.

Numerous small pits on Arrokoth's surface were identified in high resolution images from the New Horizons spacecraft. The size of these pits are measured at about 700 m (2,300 ft) across. The exact cause of these pits is unknown; several explanations for these pits include impact events, the collapse of material, the sublimation of volatile materials, or the venting and escape of volatile gases from the interior of Arrokoth.

=== Surface features ===
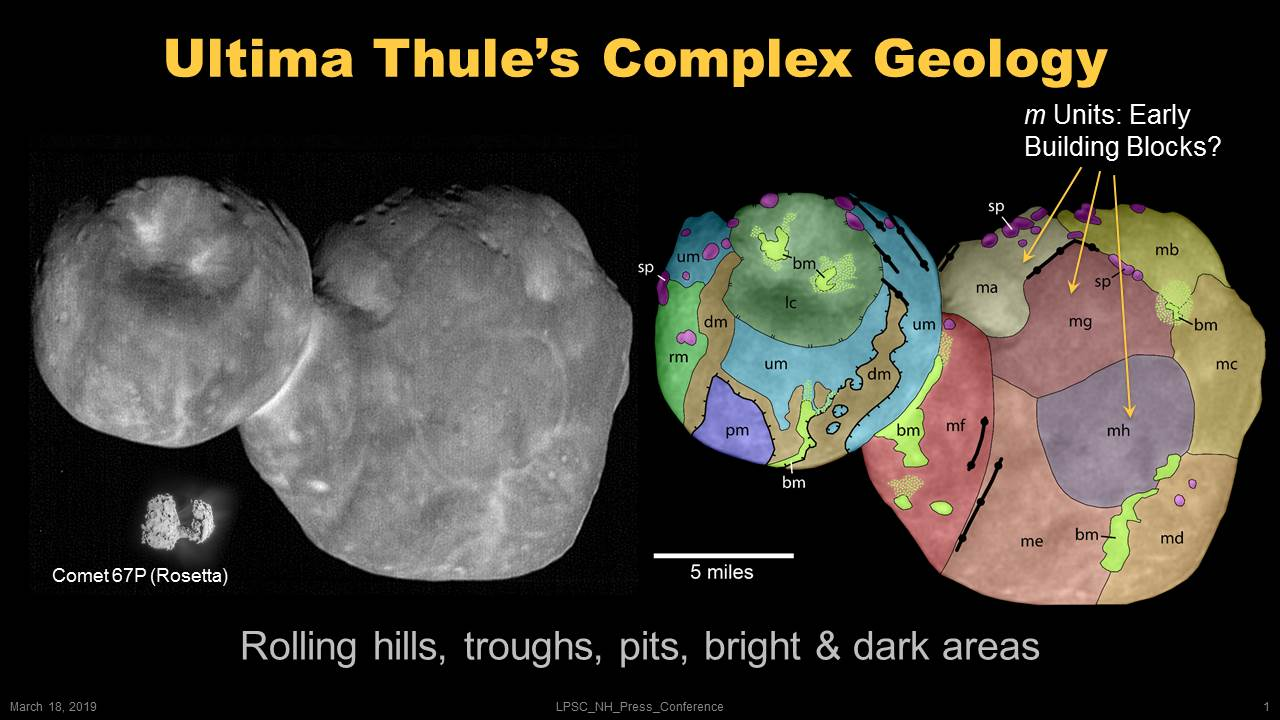
The geology of Arrokoth, with comet 67P to scale. Weeyo is depicted in cool colors (blues and greens) and Wenu in warm (yellows and reds). The labels 'bm', 'dm', 'pm', 'rm' and 'um' indicate bright, dark, patterned (mottled), rough and undifferentiated material, respectively. The eight rolling topographic units 'ma' to 'mh' may be the ancestral building blocks of Wenu. 'sp' are small pits/craters. Green 'lc' (large crater) is Sky, the yellow bright material at the neck is Akasa Linea, and the ring surrounding the purple unit 'mh' is Kaʼan Arcus.

The surfaces of each lobe of Arrokoth display regions of varying brightness along with various geological features such as troughs and hills. These geological features are thought to have originated from the clumping of smaller planetesimals that come to form the lobes of Arrokoth. The brighter regions of Arrokoth's surface, especially its bright lineation features, are thought to have resulted from the deposition of material that have rolled down from hills on Arrokoth, as surface gravity on Arrokoth is sufficient for this to occur.

The smaller lobe, Weeyo, bears a large depression feature named 'Sky' (previously dubbed 'Maryland' after the home state of the New Horizons team). Assuming Sky has a circular shape, its diameter is 6.7 km (4.2 mi), with a depth of 0.51 km (0.32 mi). Sky is likely an impact crater that was formed by an object 700 m (2,000 ft) across. Two notably bright streaks of similar size are present within Sky, and may be remnants of avalanches where bright material rolled into the depression. Four subparallel troughs are present near the terminator of Weeyo, along with two possible kilometer-sized impact craters on the rim of Sky. The surface of Weeyo exhibits bright mottled regions separated by broad, dark regions (dm) which may have undergone scarp retreat, in which they were eroded due to the sublimation of volatiles, exposing lag deposits of darker material irradiated by sunlight. Another bright region (rm), located at the equatorial end of Weeyo, exhibits rough terrain along with several topographic features that have been identified as possible pits, craters, or mounds. Weeyo does not display distinct units of rolling topography near Sky, likely as a result of resurfacing caused by the impact event that created the crater.

As on Weeyo, troughs and pit crater chains are also present along the terminator of the larger lobe Wenu. Wenu consists of eight distinctive units or blocks of rolling topography, each similarly sized at around 5 km (3.1 mi). The units are separated by relatively bright boundary regions. The similar sizes of the units suggests that each was once a small planetesimal, and that they coalesced to form Wenu. The planetesimals are expected to have accreted slowly by astronomical standards (at speeds of several meters per second), though they must have a very low mechanical strength in order to merge and form compact bodies at these speeds. The central unit ('mh') is encircled by a bright annular feature, Kaʼan Arcus (initially dubbed "The Road to Nowhere"). From stereographic analysis, the central unit appears to be relatively flat compared to the surrounding units. Stereographic analysis of Arrokoth has also shown that one particular unit located at Wenu's limb ('md') appears to have a higher elevation and tilt than the others.

Akasa Linea, the neck region connecting the two lobes, has a brighter and less red appearance than the surfaces of either lobe. The brightness of Akasa Linea is likely due to a composition of a more reflective material than the surfaces of the lobes. One hypothesis suggests the bright material originated in the deposition of small particles that had fallen from the lobes over time. Since Arrokoth's center of gravity lies between the lobes, small particles are likely to roll down the steep slopes toward the center between each lobe. Another proposal suggests the bright material is produced by the deposition of ammonia ice. Ammonia vapor present on the surface of Arrokoth would solidify around Akasa Linea, where gases cannot escape due to the concave shape of the neck. The brightness of Akasa is thought to be maintained by high seasonal axial tilt as Arrokoth orbits around the Sun. Over the course of its orbit, Akasa Linea is shadowed when the lobes are coplanar to the direction of the Sun, at which times the neck region receives no sunlight, cooling and trapping volatiles in the region.

In May 2020, the IAU's Working Group for Planetary System Nomenclature (WGPSN) formally established a naming theme for all features of Arrokoth, which are to be named after words for "sky" in the languages of the world, past and present. In 2021, the first few names were approved, including Sky Crater on the small lobe, later named Weeyo Lobus. In 2022, Kaʼan Arcus was approved for the circular arc on Wenu Lobus. On 17 December 2025, Akasa Linea was changed to Akasa Collum.

Named features
Name	Feature	Named after	Name approved (Date · Ref)
Wenu Lobus	the larger lobe of Arrokoth, provisionally "Ultima"	wenu, the Mapudungun word for 'sky, above'	11 April 2022
Weeyo Lobus	the smaller lobe, provisionally "Thule"	𞤱𞤫𞥅𞤴𞤮 weeyo, the Pulaar word for 'sky'	11 April 2022
Akasa Collum	the bright ring on the neck between the lobes	আকাশ akaś, the Bengali word for 'sky'	2 September 2021, 17 December 2025
Kaʼan Arcus	the circular linea (the "Road to Nowhere") in the center of Wenu	kaʼan, the Mayan word for 'sky'; near homonym for 'snake'	2 September 2021
Sky	the large compaction crater on Weeyo	The English word 'sky'	2 September 2021

=== Internal structure ===
Topography variations at the limb of Arrokoth suggest that its interior is likely composed of mechanically strong material consisting of mostly amorphous water ice and rocky material. Trace amounts of methane and other volatile gases in the form of vapors may also be present in Arrokoth's interior, trapped in water ice. Under the assumption that Arrokoth has a low comet-like density of around 0.5 g/cm^{3}, its internal structure is expected to be porous, as volatile gases trapped in Arrokoth's interior are thought to escape from the interior to the surface. Assuming that Arrokoth may have an internal heat source caused by the radioactive decay of radionuclides, the trapped volatile gases inside Arrokoth would migrate outward and escape from the surface, similarly to the scenario of outgassing of comets. The escaped gases may subsequently freeze and deposit on Arrokoth's surface, and could possibly account for the presence of ices and tholins on its surface.

== Orbit and classification ==
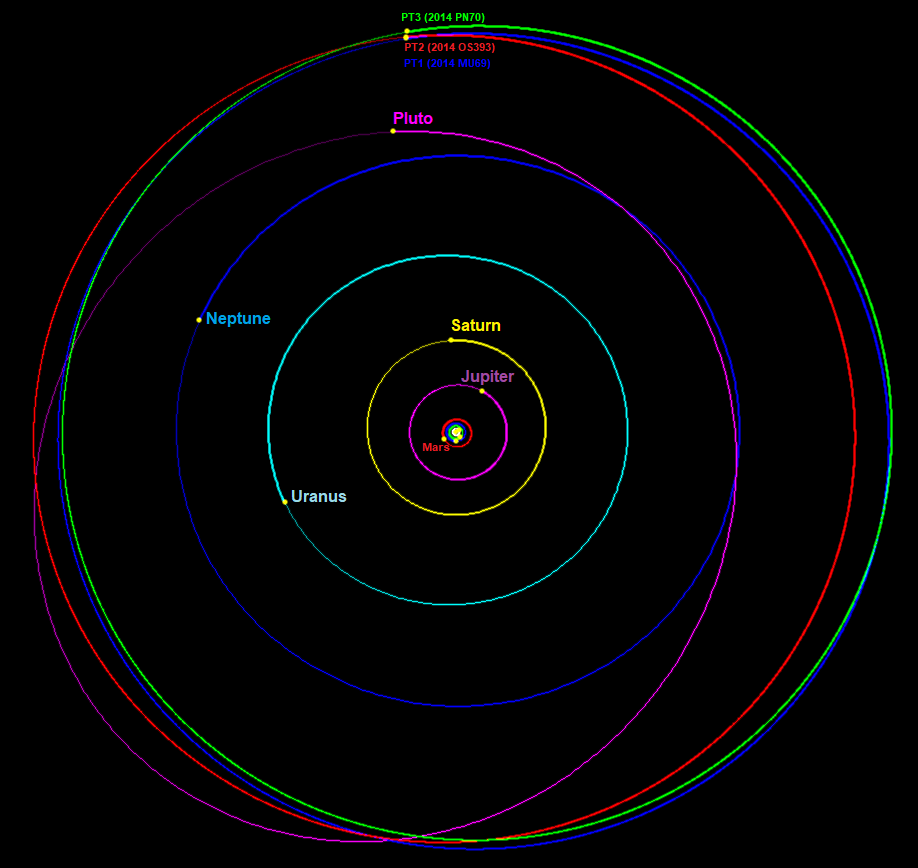
The orbits of New Horizons potential targets 1 to 3. Arrokoth (PT1) is in blue, 2014 OS393 (PT2) is in red, and 2014 PN70 (PT3) is in green.

Animation of New Horizons's trajectory from 19 January 2006 to 30 December 2030
New Horizons · 486958 Arrokoth · Earth · 132524 APL · Jupiter · Pluto

Arrokoth orbits the Sun at an average distance of 44.2 astronomical units (6.61×10^{9} km; 4.11×10^{9} mi), taking 294 years to complete a full orbit around the Sun. Having a low orbital eccentricity of 0.04, Arrokoth follows a nearly circular orbit around the Sun, only slightly varying in distance from 42.6 AU at perihelion to 45.9 AU at aphelion. Because Arrokoth has a low orbital eccentricity, it does not approach close enough to Neptune for its orbit to become perturbed. (Arrokoth's minimum orbital intersection distance from Neptune is 12.7 AU.) Arrokoth's orbit appears to be stable over long time scales; simulations by the Deep Ecliptic Survey show that its orbit will not significantly change over the next 10 million years. At the time of the New Horizons flyby in January 2019, Arrokoth's distance from the Sun was 43.28 AU (6.47×10^{9} km; 4.02×10^{9} mi). At this distance, light from the Sun takes over six hours to reach Arrokoth.

Arrokoth is generally classified as a distant minor planet or trans-Neptunian object by the Minor Planet Center as it orbits in the outer Solar System beyond Neptune. Having a non-resonant orbit within the Kuiper belt region 39.5–48 AU from the Sun, Arrokoth is classified as a classical Kuiper belt object, or cubewano. Arrokoth's orbit is inclined to the ecliptic plane by 2.45 degrees, relatively low compared to other classical Kuiper belt objects such as Makemake. Since Arrokoth has a low orbital inclination and eccentricity, it is part of the dynamically cold population of classical Kuiper belt objects, which are unlikely to have undergone significant perturbations by Neptune during its outward migration in the past. The cold classical population of Kuiper belt objects are thought to be remnant planetesimals left over from the accretion of material during the formation of the Solar System.

== Rotation and temperature ==
Sequence of three images showing Arrokoth's rotation over a period of 2.5 hours

Near-polar view of Arrokoth's rotation over a period of nine hours

Results from photometric Hubble Space Telescope observations show that the brightness of Arrokoth varies by around 0.3 magnitudes as it rotates. Though the rotation period and light curve amplitude of Arrokoth could not be determined from Hubble observations, the subtle brightness variations suggested that Arrokoth's rotational axis is either pointed toward the Earth or is being viewed at an equator-on configuration with a nearly spherical shape, with a constrained a/b best-fit aspect ratio around 1.0–1.15.

Upon the New Horizons spacecraft's approach to Arrokoth, no rotational light curve amplitude was detected by the spacecraft despite Arrokoth's irregular shape. To explain the lack of its rotational light curve, scientists surmised that Arrokoth is rotating on its side, with its rotational axis pointing nearly directly at the approaching New Horizons spacecraft. Subsequent images of Arrokoth from New Horizons upon approach confirmed that its rotation is tilted, with its south pole facing towards the Sun. The rotational axis of Arrokoth is tilted 99 degrees to its orbit. Based on occultation and New Horizons imaging data, Arrokoth's rotation period is determined to be 15.938 hours.

Due to the high axial tilt of its rotation, the solar irradiance of the northern and southern hemispheres of Arrokoth varies greatly over the course of its orbit around the Sun. As it orbits around the Sun, one polar region of Arrokoth faces the Sun continuously while the other faces away. The solar irradiance of Arrokoth varies by 17 percent due to the low eccentricity of its orbit. The average temperature of Arrokoth is estimated to be around 42 K (−231.2 °C; −384.1 °F), with a maximum of around 60 K on the illuminated subsolar point of Arrokoth. Radiometric measurements from the New Horizons REX instrument indicate that the mean surface temperature of Arrokoth's unilluminated face is about 29±5 K, higher than the modeled range of 12–14 K. The higher temperature of Arrokoth's unilluminated face as measured by REX implies that thermal radiation is emitted from Arrokoth's subsurface, which was predicted to be intrinsically warmer than the exterior surface.

== Mass and density ==
The mass and density of Arrokoth are unknown. A definitive mass and density estimate cannot be given as the lobes are in contact rather than orbiting each other. Although a possible natural satellite orbiting Arrokoth could help determine its mass, no such satellites were found. Under the assumption that both lobes are bound by self-gravity, with the mutual gravity of the two overcoming centrifugal forces that would otherwise separate them, Arrokoth is estimated to have a very low density similar to that of comets, with an estimated minimum density of 0.29 g/cm^{3}. In order to maintain the shape of the neck, the density of Arrokoth must be less than the maximum possible density of 1 g/cm^{3}, otherwise the neck would be excessively compressed by the mutual gravity of the lobes such that the entire object would gravitationally collapse into a spheroid.

== Formation ==
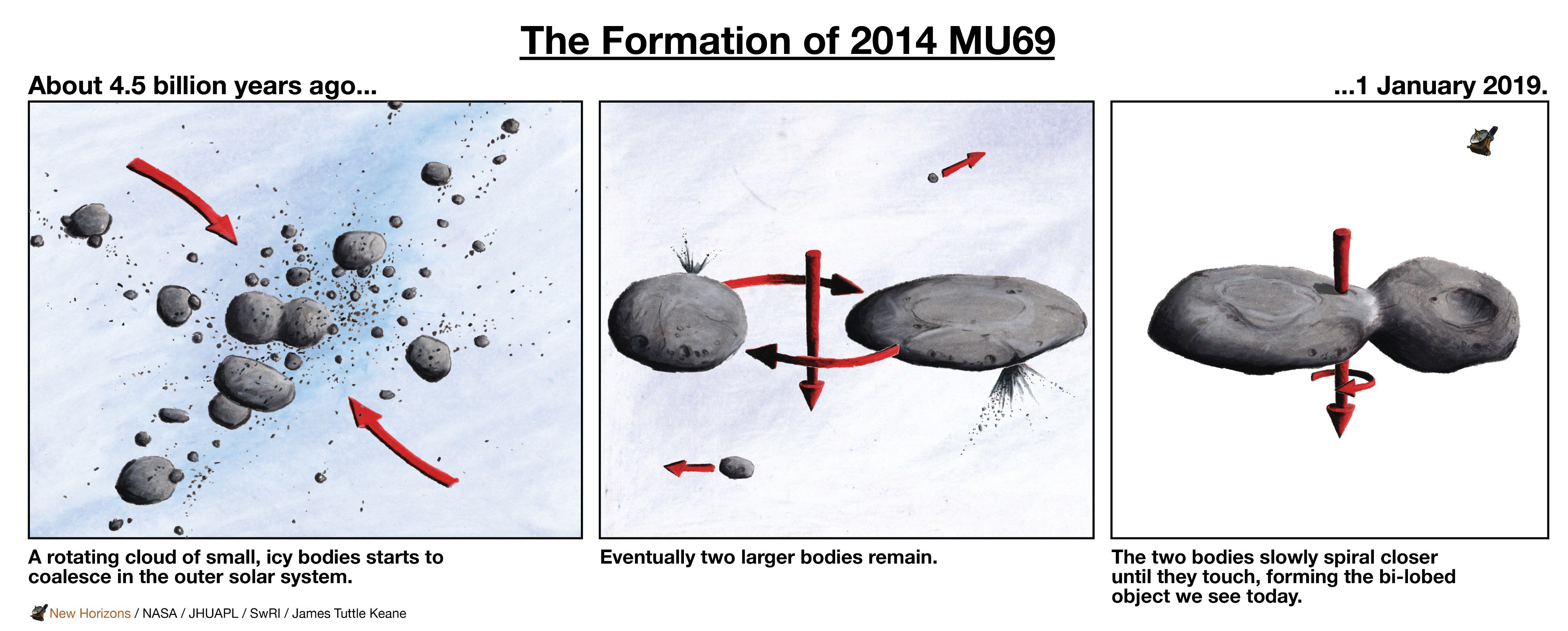
Illustration depicting the hypothesized formation sequence of Arrokoth.

Arrokoth is thought to have formed from two separate progenitor objects that formed over time from a rotating cloud of small, icy bodies since the formation of the Solar System 4.6 billion years ago. Arrokoth had likely formed in a colder environment within a dense, opaque region of the early Kuiper belt where the Sun appeared heavily obscured by dust. Icy particles within the early Kuiper belt experienced streaming instability, in which they slowed down due to drag against the surrounding gas and dust, and gravitationally coalesced into clumps of larger particles.

Because there have been few to no disruptive impacts on Arrokoth since it formed, the details of its formation have been preserved. From the differing present appearances of the lobes, each is thought to have accreted separately while in orbit around each other. Both progenitor objects are believed to have formed from a single source of material as they appear to be homogeneous in albedo, color, and composition. The presence of rolling topography units on the larger object indicates that it had likely formed from the coalescence of smaller planetesimal units prior to merging with the smaller object. The larger lobe Wenu appears to be an aggregate of 8 or so smaller components, each approximately 5 km (3 mi) across.

=== Flattening and merging ===
It is unclear how Arrokoth has attained its present flattened shape, though two leading hypotheses have been postulated to explain the mechanisms leading to its flattened shape during the formation of the Solar System. The New Horizons team hypothesizes that the two progenitor objects formed with initially rapid rotations, causing their shapes to become flattened due to centrifugal forces. Over time, the rotation rates of the progenitor objects gradually slowed down as they experienced impacts by small objects and transferred their angular momentum to other orbiting debris left over from their formation. Eventually, loss of momentum, caused by impacts and momentum shifting to other bodies in the cloud, caused the pair to slowly spiral closer until they touched—where over time the joints fused together, forming its present bilobate shape.

In an alternative hypothesis formulated by researchers of the Chinese Academy of Sciences and the Max Planck Institute in 2020, the flattening of Arrokoth may have resulted from the process of sublimation-driven mass loss over a timescale of several million years after the merging of the lobes. At the time of formation, Arrokoth's composition had a higher volatile concentration from the accretion of condensed volatiles within the dense and opaque Kuiper belt. After the surrounding dust and nebula subsided, solar radiation was no longer obstructed, allowing for photon-induced sublimation to occur in the Kuiper belt. Due to Arrokoth's high rotational obliquity, one polar region faces the Sun continuously for half of its orbital period, resulting in extensive heating and consequent sublimation and loss of frozen volatiles at Arrokoth's poles.

Regardless of the uncertainty surrounding the mechanisms for the flattening of Arrokoth, the subsequent merging of the bodies ancestral to the lobes appeared to be gentle. The present appearance of Arrokoth does not indicate deformation or compression fractures, suggesting that the two progenitor objects had merged very slowly at a speed of 2 m/s (6.6 ft/s)—comparable to the average walking speed of a person. The progenitor objects must have also merged obliquely at angles greater than 75 degrees in order to account for the present shape of Arrokoth's thin neck while keeping the lobes intact. By the time the two progenitor objects merged, both of them had already been tidally locked in synchronous rotation.

The long-term frequency of impact events occurring on Arrokoth was low due to the slower speeds of objects in the Kuiper belt. Over a period of 4.5 billion years, photon-induced sputtering of water ice on Arrokoth's surface would minimally reduce its size by 1 cm (0.39 in). With the lack of frequent cratering events and perturbations of its orbit, the shape and appearance of Arrokoth would remain virtually pristine since the conjoining of two separate objects that formed its bilobate shape.

== Observation ==
=== Discovery ===
Discovery images of Arrokoth, cropped from five Wide Field Camera 3 images taken by the Hubble Space Telescope on 26 June 2014.

Arrokoth was discovered on 26 June 2014 using the Hubble Space Telescope during a preliminary survey to find a suitable Kuiper belt object for the New Horizons spacecraft to fly by. Scientists of the New Horizons team were searching for an object in the Kuiper belt that the spacecraft could study after Pluto, and their next target had to be reachable on New Horizons's remaining fuel. Using large ground-based telescopes on Earth, researchers began looking in 2011 for candidate objects and searched multiple times per year for several years. However, none of the objects found were reachable by the New Horizons spacecraft and most Kuiper belt objects that may be suitable were just too distant and faint to be seen through Earth's atmosphere. In order to find these fainter Kuiper belt objects, the New Horizons team initiated a search for suitable targets with the Hubble Space Telescope on 16 June 2014.

Arrokoth was first imaged by Hubble on 26 June 2014, 10 days after the New Horizons team began their search for potential targets. While digitally processing images from Hubble, Arrokoth was identified by astronomer Marc Buie, member of the New Horizons team. Buie reported his finding to the search team for subsequent analysis and confirmation. Arrokoth was the second object found during the search, after 2014 MT69. Three more candidate targets were later discovered with Hubble, though follow-up astrometric observations eventually ruled them out. Of the five potential targets found with Hubble, Arrokoth was deemed to be the most feasible target for the spacecraft as the flyby trajectory required the least amount of fuel compared to that for 2014 PN70, the second most feasible target for New Horizons. On 28 August 2015, Arrokoth was officially selected by NASA as a flyby target for the New Horizons spacecraft.

Arrokoth is too small and distant for its shape to be observed directly from Earth, but scientists were able to take advantage of an astronomical event called a stellar occultation, in which the object passes in front of a star from the vantage point of Earth. Since the occultation event is only visible from certain parts of the Earth, the New Horizons team combined data from Hubble and the European Space Agency's Gaia space observatory to figure out exactly when and where on Earth's surface Arrokoth would cast a shadow. They determined that occultations would occur on 3 June, 10 July, and 17 July in 2017, and set off for places around the world where they could see Arrokoth cover up a different star on each of these dates. Based on this string of three occultations, scientists were able to trace out the object's shape.

=== 2017 occultations ===
Results of the 2017 occultation campaign
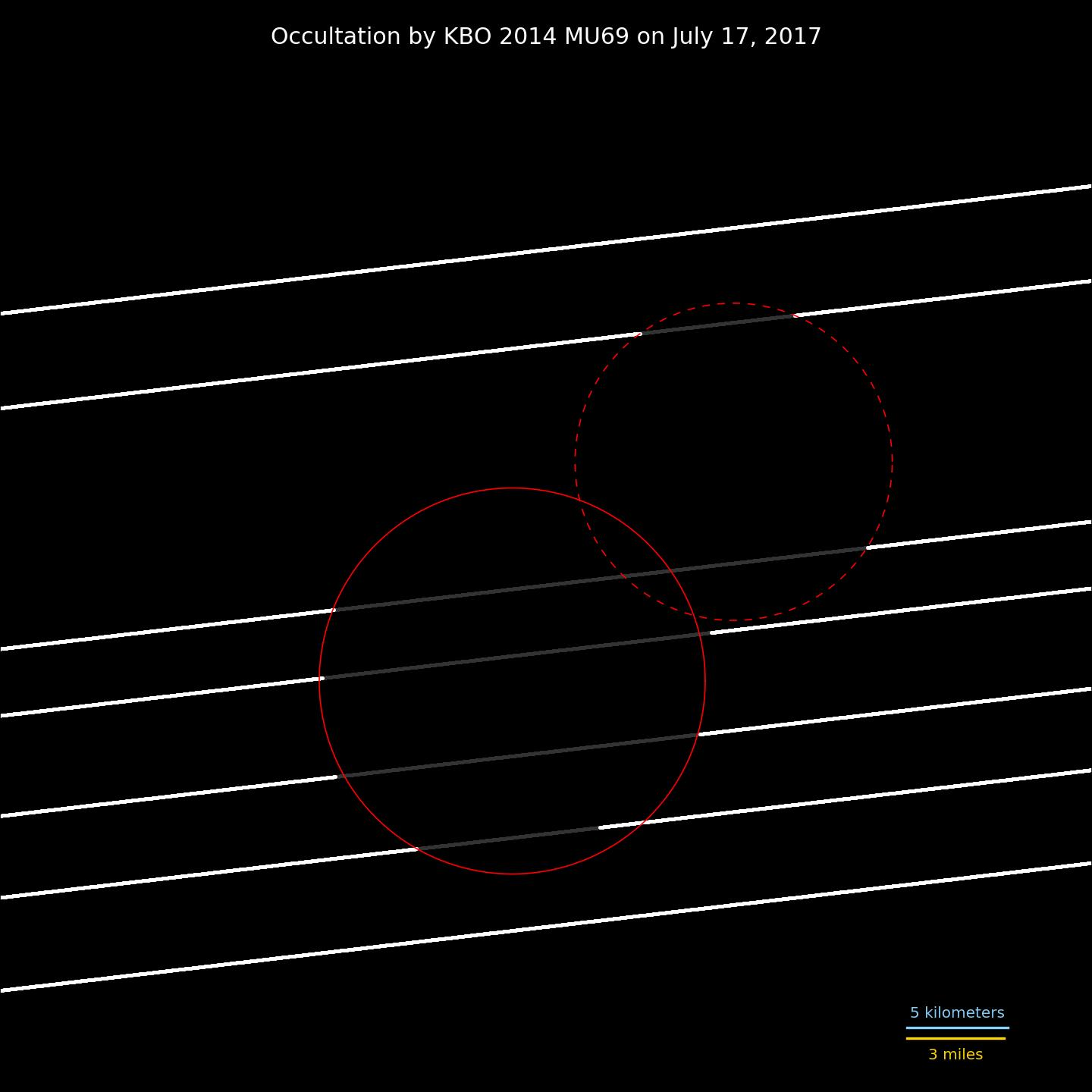
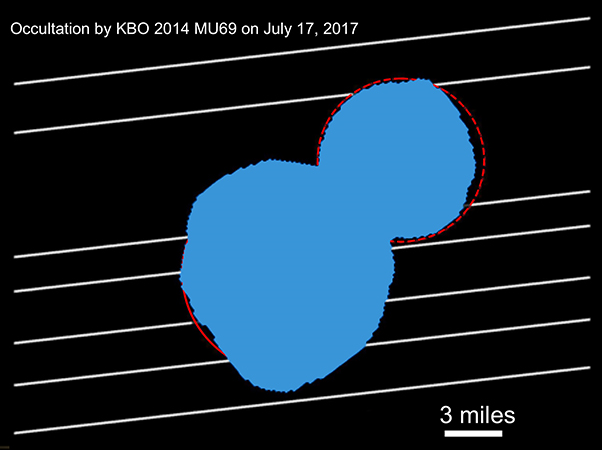
Arrokoth briefly blocked the light from an unnamed star in Sagittarius during an occultation on 17 July 2017. Data from 24 telescopes that captured this event revealed Arrokoth's possible bilobate or binary shape. After the flyby in January 2019, the results from the occultation were shown to precisely fit the observed size and shape of the object.
Pre-flyby conceptual art, based on occultation data

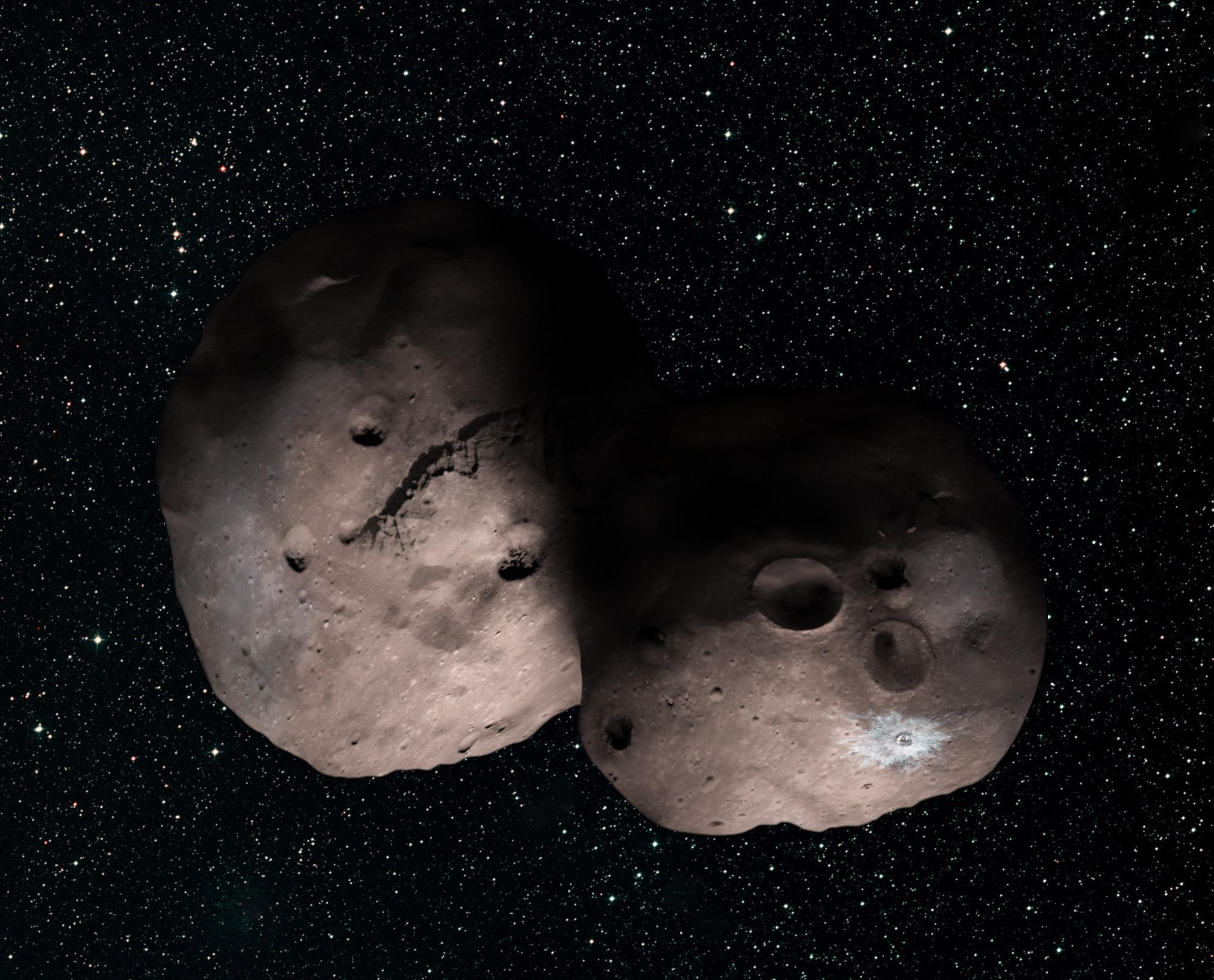
Artist concept of Arrokoth as a contact binary, illustrating the understanding as of August 2017

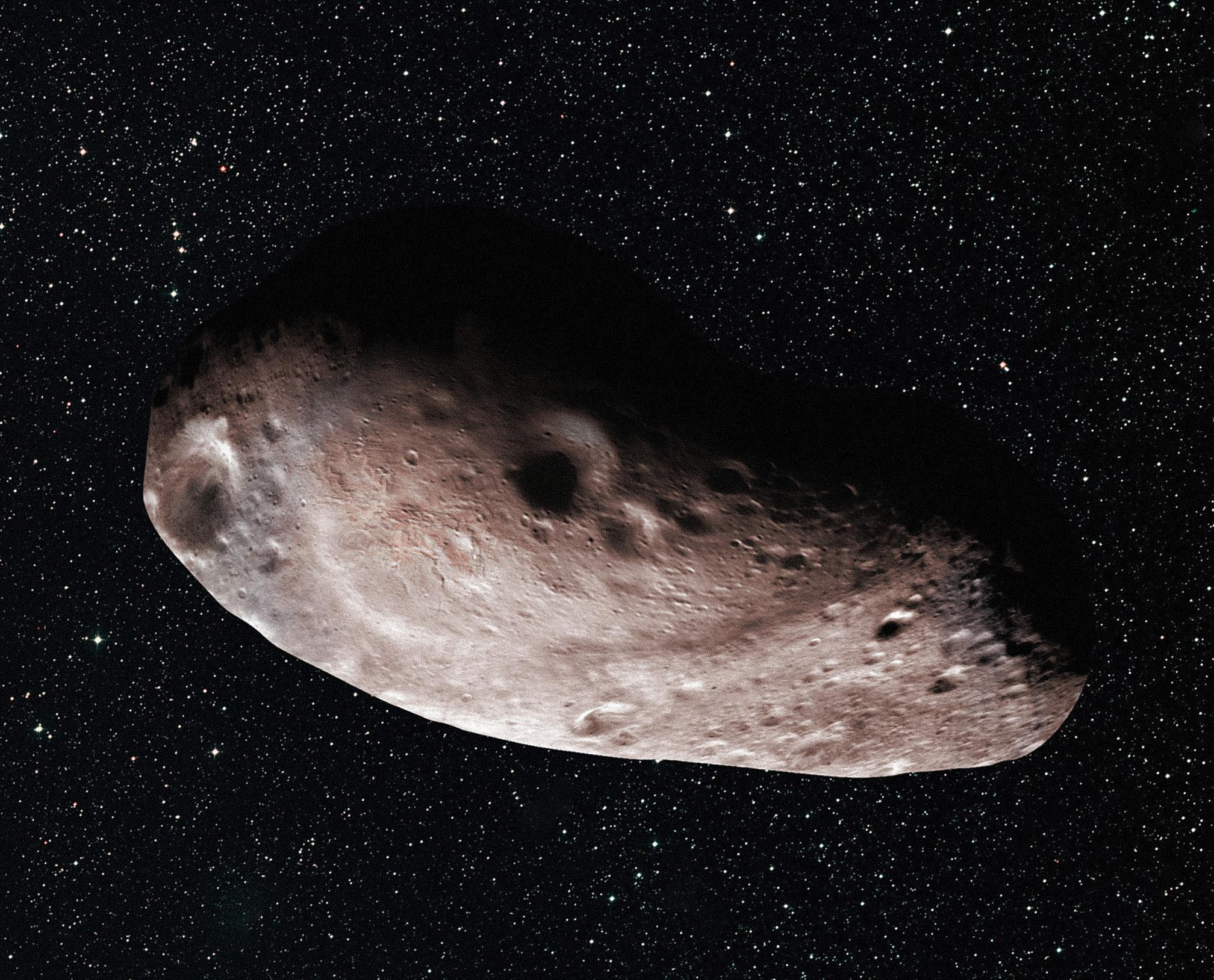
Artist concept of an ellipsoid shape for Arrokoth, a shape that could not be ruled out prior to the flyby in 2019

In June and July 2017, Arrokoth occulted three background stars. The team behind New Horizons formed a specialized "KBO Chasers" team led by Marc Buie to observe these stellar occultations from South America, Africa, and the Pacific Ocean. On 3 June 2017, two teams of NASA scientists tried to detect the shadow of Arrokoth from Argentina and South Africa. When they found that none of their telescopes had observed the object's shadow, it was initially speculated that Arrokoth might be neither as large nor as dark as previously expected, and that it might be highly reflective or even a swarm. Additional data taken with the Hubble Space Telescope in June and July 2017 revealed that the telescopes had been placed in the wrong location, and that these estimations were incorrect.

On 10 July 2017, the airborne telescope SOFIA was successfully placed close to the predicted centerline for the second occultation while flying over the Pacific Ocean from Christchurch, New Zealand. The main purpose of those observations was the search for hazardous material like rings or dust near Arrokoth that could threaten the New Horizons spacecraft during its flyby in 2019. Data collection was successful. A preliminary analysis suggested that the central shadow was missed; only in January 2018 was it realized that SOFIA had indeed observed a very brief dip from the central shadow. The data collected by SOFIA will also be valuable to put constraints on dust near Arrokoth. Detailed results of the search for hazardous material were presented on the 49th Meeting of the AAS Division for Planetary Sciences, on 20 October 2017.

On 17 July 2017, the Hubble Space Telescope was used to check for debris around Arrokoth, setting constraints on rings and debris within the Hill sphere of Arrokoth at distances of up to 75,000 km (47,000 mi) from the main body. For the third and final occultation, team members set up another ground-based "fence line" of 24 mobile telescopes along the predicted ground track of the occultation shadow in southern Argentina (Chubut and Santa Cruz provinces) to better constrain the size of Arrokoth. The average spacing between these telescopes was around 4 km (2.5 mi). Using the latest observations from Hubble, the position of Arrokoth was known with much better precision than for the 3 June occultation, and this time the shadow of Arrokoth was successfully observed by at least five of the mobile telescopes. Combined with the SOFIA observations, this put constraints on possible debris near Arrokoth.

Results from the occultation on 17 July showed that Arrokoth could have had a very oblong, irregular shape or be a close or contact binary. According to the duration of the observed chords, Arrokoth was shown to have two "lobes", with diameters of approximately 20 km (12 mi) and 18 km (11 mi), respectively. A preliminary analysis of all collected data suggested that Arrokoth was accompanied by an orbiting moonlet about 200–300 km (120–190 mi) away from the primary. It was later realized, however, that an error with the data processing software resulted in a shift in the apparent location of the target. After accounting for the bug, the short dip observed on 10 July was considered to be a detection of the primary body.

By combining data about its light curve, spectra (e.g. color), and stellar occultation data, illustrations could rely on known data to create a concept of what it might look like prior to spacecraft flyby.

=== 2018 occultations ===
There were two potentially useful Arrokoth occultations predicted for 2018: one on 16 July and one on 4 August. Neither of these were as good as the three 2017 events. No attempts were made to observe the 16 July 2018 occultation, which took place over the South Atlantic and the Indian Ocean. For the 4 August 2018 event, two teams, consisting of about 50 researchers in total, went to locations in Senegal and Colombia. The event gathered media attention in Senegal, where it was used as an opportunity for science outreach. Despite some stations being affected by bad weather, the event was successfully observed, as reported by the New Horizons team. Initially, it was unclear whether a chord on the target had been recorded. On 6 September 2018, NASA confirmed that the star had indeed been seen to dip by at least one observer, providing important information about the size and shape of Arrokoth.

Hubble observations were carried out on 4 August 2018, to support the occultation campaign. Hubble could not be placed in the narrow path of the occultation, but due to the favourable location of Hubble at the time of the event, the space telescope was able to probe the region down to 1,600 km (990 mi) from Arrokoth. This is much closer than the 20,000 km (12,000 mi) region that could be observed during the 17 July 2017 occultation. No brightness changes of the target star have been seen by Hubble, ruling out any optically thick rings or debris down to 1,600 km (990 mi) from Arrokoth. Results of the 2017 and 2018 occultation campaigns were presented at the 50th meeting of the American Astronomical Society Division for Planetary Sciences on 26 October 2018.

== Exploration ==
Arrokoth among the stars of Sagittarius—with and without background star omission (apparent magnitude 20 to 15; late 2018).

Movie of New Horizons's approach to Arrokoth, constructed from images taken by the spacecraft during its flyby on 1 January 2019

View of Arrokoth by New Horizons after closest approach. The silhouette of Arrokoth's shape can be seen among the background stars.

Having completed its flyby of Pluto in July 2015, the New Horizons spacecraft made four course changes in October and November 2015 to place itself on a trajectory towards Arrokoth. It is the first object to be targeted for a flyby that was discovered after the visiting spacecraft was launched, and is the farthest object in the Solar System ever to be visited by a spacecraft. Moving at a speed of 51,500 km/h (858 km/min; 14.3 km/s; 32,000 mph) New Horizons passed by Arrokoth at a distance of 3,538 km (2,198 mi), equivalent to a few minutes of travel at the craft's speed, and one third of the distance of the spacecraft's closest encounter with Pluto. Closest approach occurred on 1 January 2019, at 05:33 UTC (Spacecraft Event Time – SCET) at which point it was 43.4 AU from the Sun in the direction of the constellation Sagittarius. At this distance, the one-way transit time for radio signals between Earth and New Horizons was 6 hours.

New Horizons closest approach was towards the celestial north of Arrokoth. Owing to Arrokoth's tilted rotation (with its rotational axis south pole facing towards the Sun), the rotational north pole hemisphere was mostly in darkness during New Horizons flyby.

The science objectives of the flyby include characterizing the geology and morphology of Arrokoth, and mapping the surface composition (searching for ammonia, carbon monoxide, methane, and water ice). Surveys of the surrounding environment to detect possible orbiting moonlets, a coma, or rings, were conducted. Images with resolutions showing details of 30 m (98 ft) to 70 m (230 ft) are expected. From Hubble observations, faint, small satellites orbiting Arrokoth at distances greater than 2,000 km (1,200 mi) have been excluded to a depth of >29th magnitude. The object has no detectable atmosphere, and no large rings or satellites larger than 1.6 km (1 mi) in diameter. Nonetheless, a search for a related moon (or moons) continues, which may help better explain the formation of Arrokoth from two individual orbiting objects.

New Horizons made its first detection of Arrokoth on 16 August 2018, from a distance of 172 million km (107 million mi). At that time, Arrokoth was visible at magnitude 20, in the direction of the constellation Sagittarius. Arrokoth was expected to be magnitude 18 by mid-November, and magnitude 15 by mid-December. It reached naked eye brightness (magnitude 6) from the spacecraft's point of view just 3–4 hours before closest approach. If obstacles were detected, the spacecraft had the option of diverting to a more distant rendezvous, though no moons, rings or other hazards were seen. High-resolution images from New Horizons were taken on 1 January. The first images of mediocre resolution arrived the next day. The downlink of data collected from the flyby was expected to last 20 months, through September 2020.

== Gallery ==
LORRI images of Arrokoth from December 2018 to January 2019

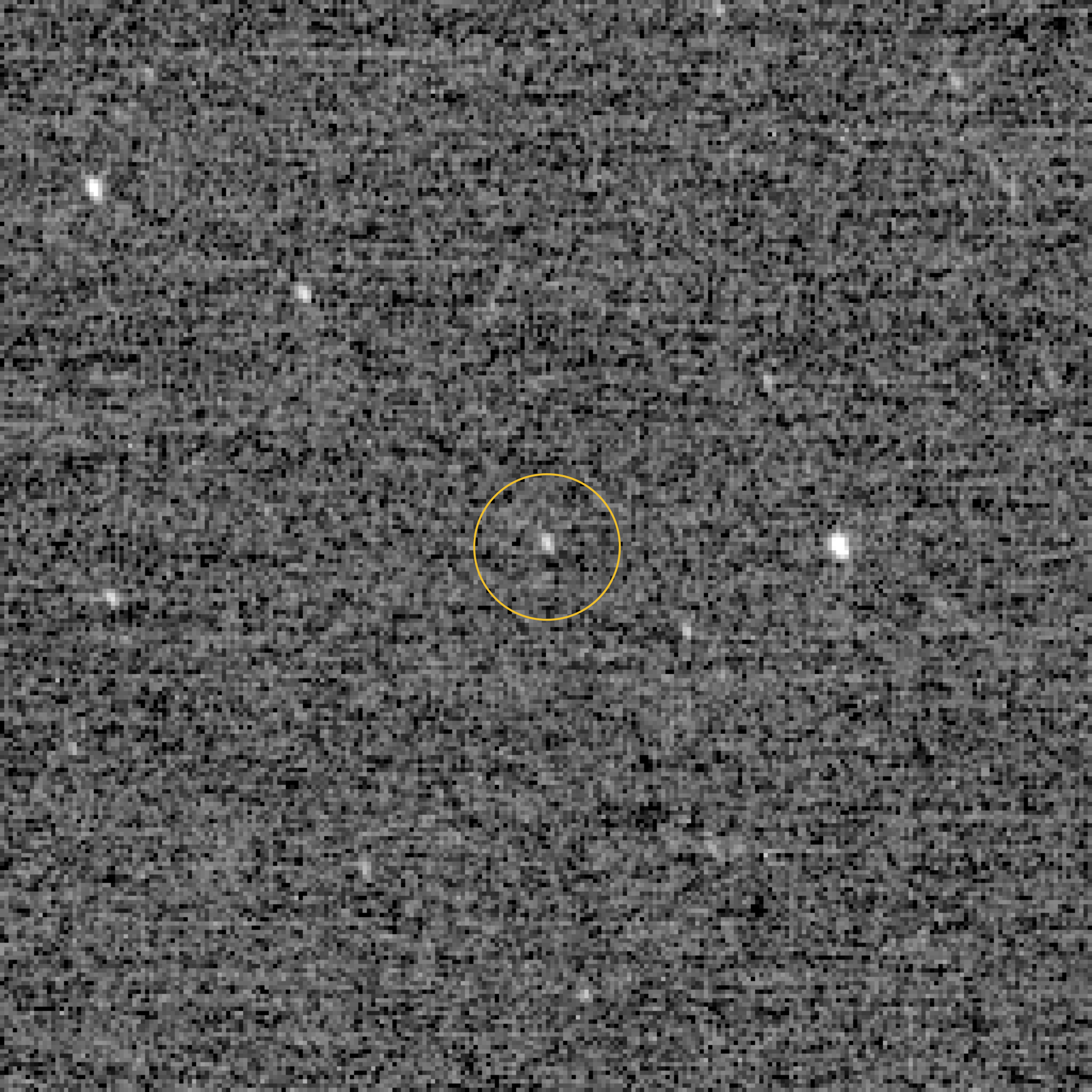
24 Dec 2018, at a distance of 10 million km (6.2 million mi)

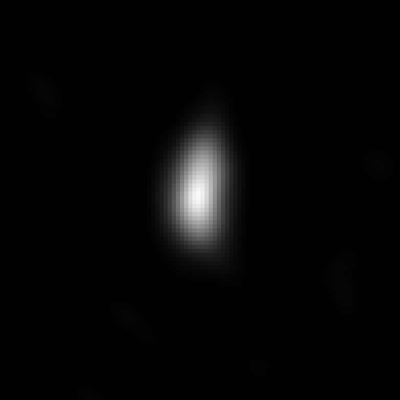
24 hours before closest approach, 1.9 million km (1.2 million mi)

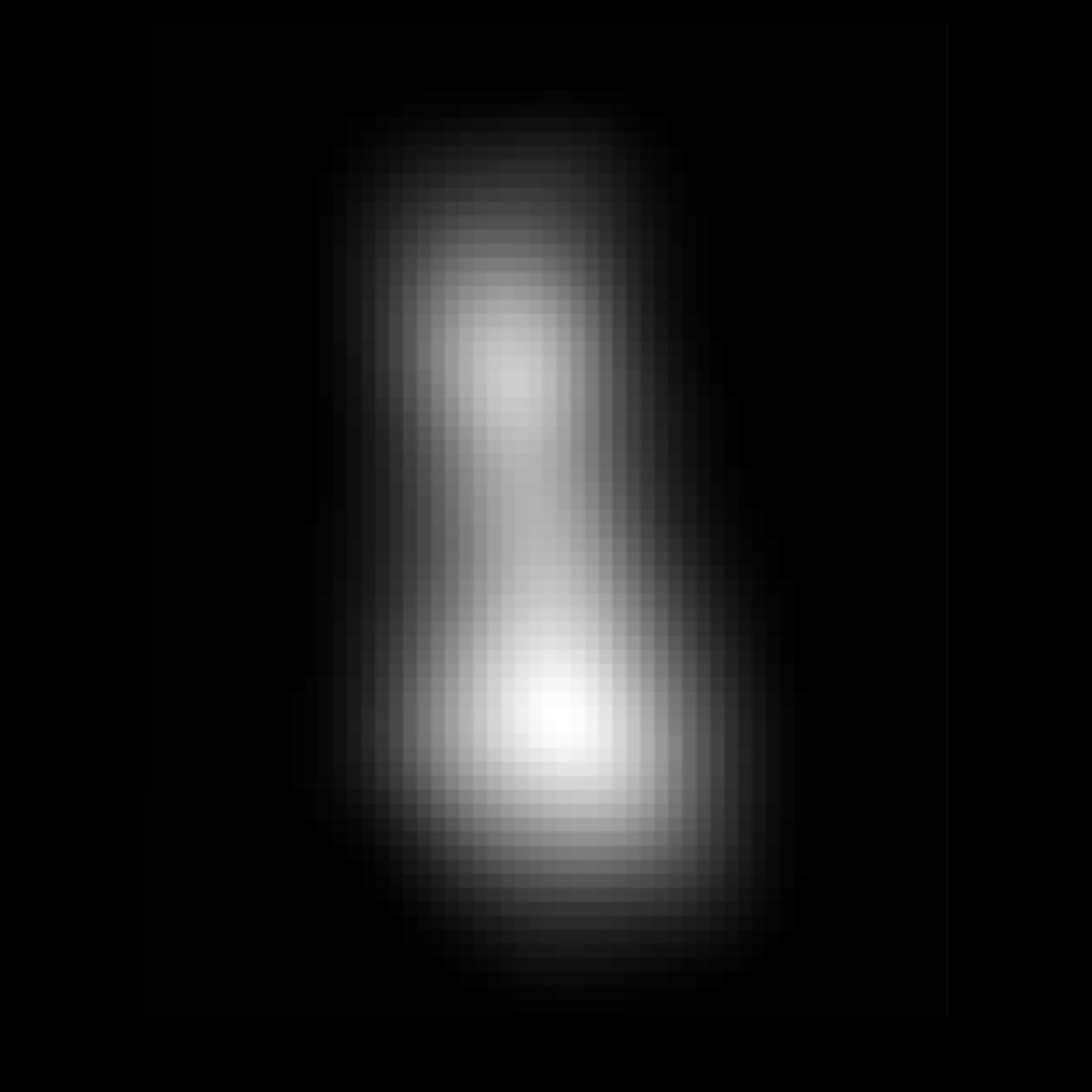
12 hours before closest approach, 1 million km (0.62 million mi)

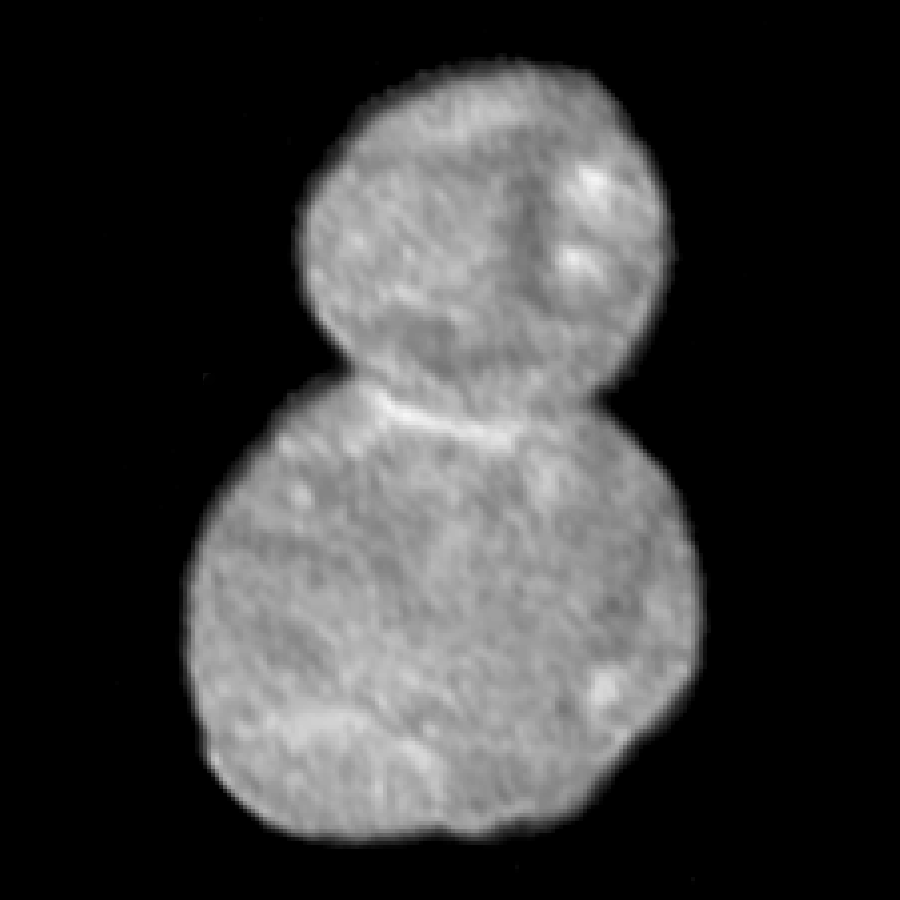
4:08 UT (SCET), 137,000 km (85,000 mi)

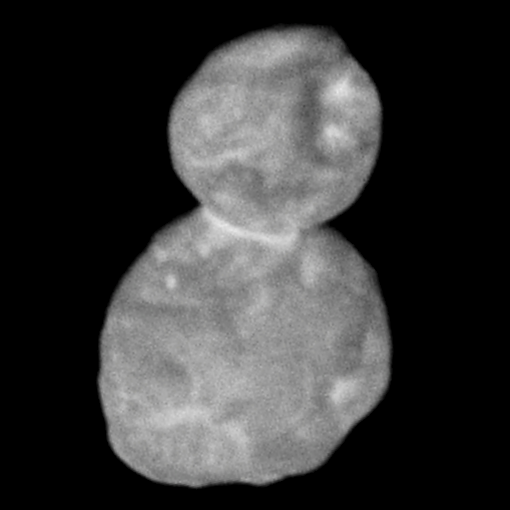
5:01 UT, 73,900 km (45,900 mi)

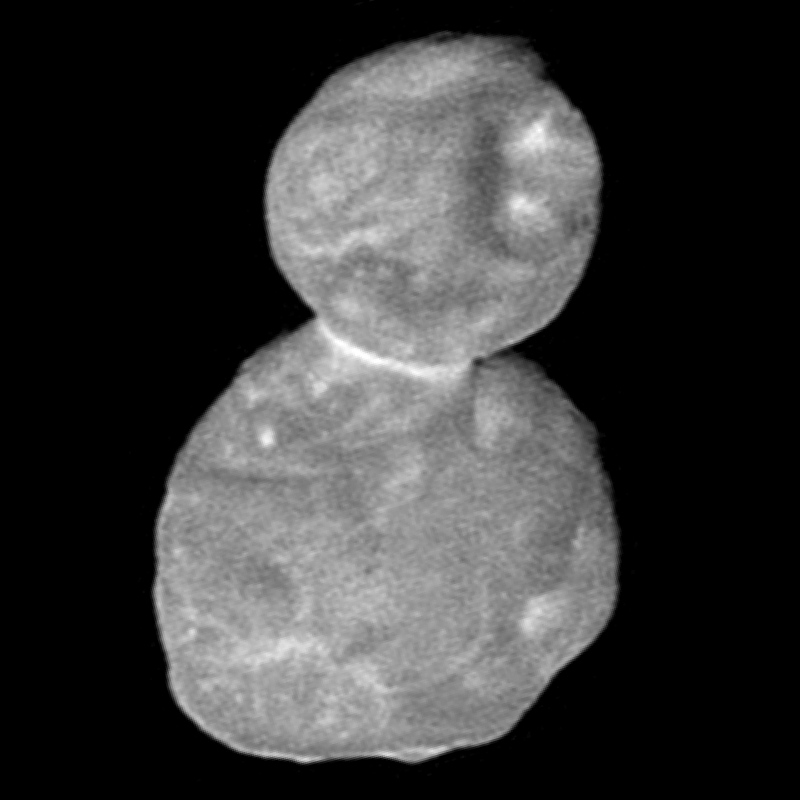
5:14 UT, 16,700 km (10,400 mi)

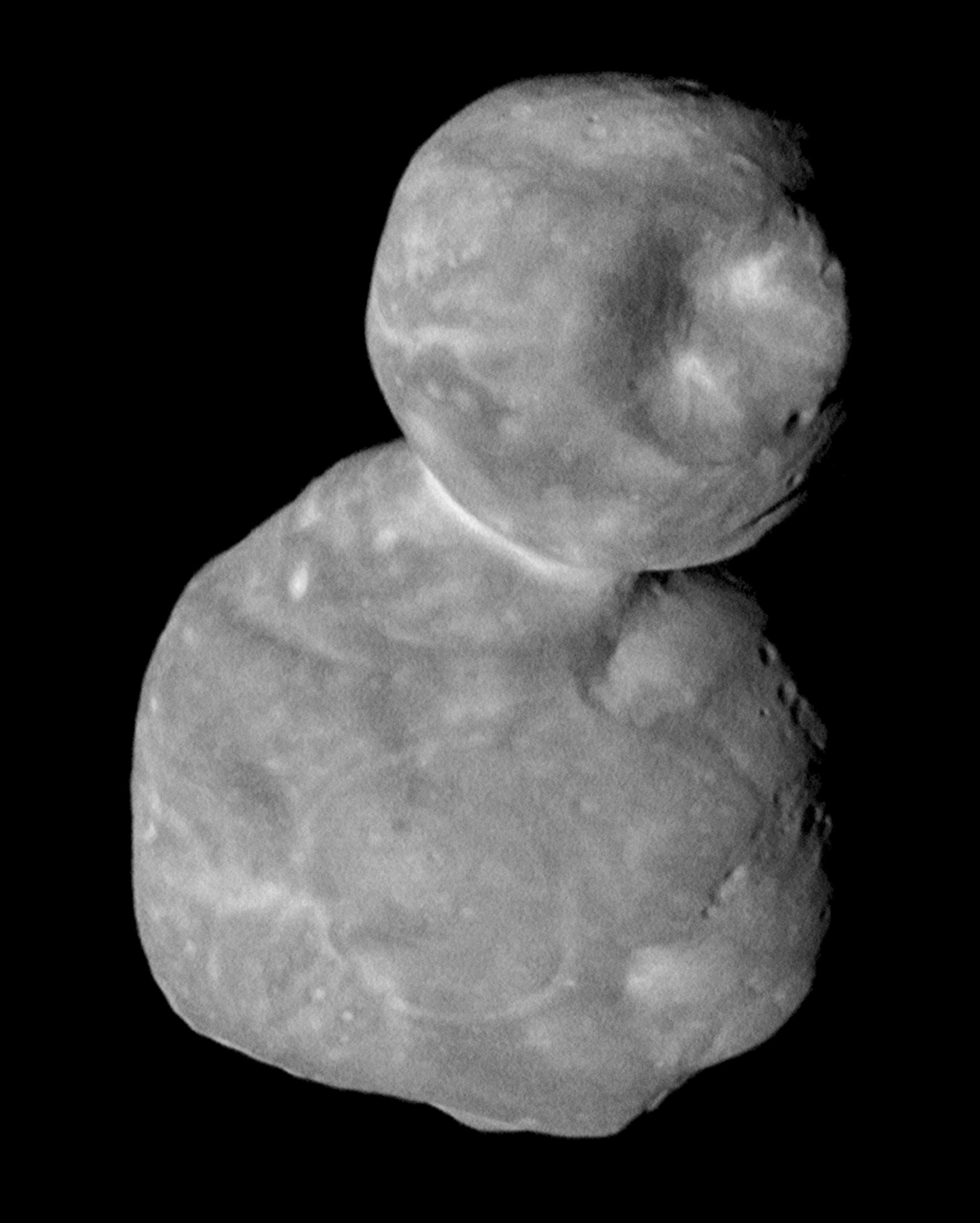
5:27 UT, 6,600 km (4,100 mi) (Note: Taken 6.5 minutes before closest approach at 5:33 UT. Note that the view and illumination is now from a slightly different angle as the spacecraft begins to bypass Arrokoth.)

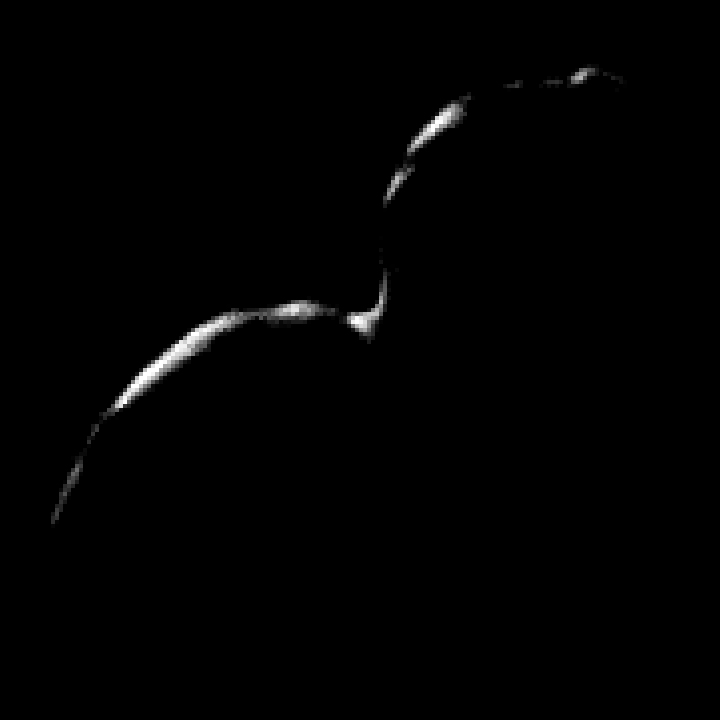
5:42 UT, after closest approach; 8,900 km (5,500 mi)

== See also ==
- List of minor planets and comets visited by spacecraft
- 132524 APL – Another minor planet visited by New Horizons
- List of trans-Neptunian objects
