= Hildegard Korf Kallmann-Bijl =

German-born American physicist (1908–1968)

Hildegard Gertrud Helen Korf Kallmann-Bijl (September 18, 1908 – November 7, 1968) was a German-born physicist with Jewish roots who emigrated to the United States where she founded and was the first chair of Committee on Space Research (COSPAR) in Brussels, Belgium. She has been described as "one of the most active pioneers in her examination of the physics of high atmosphere for the flight calculations of satellites."

== Biography ==
Hildegard Korf was born in Gelsenkirchen, Germany, 1908 and raised in the Catholic faith. She studied philosophy at the University of Berlin, metallurgy at Technische Hochschule, and physics at University of California, Los Angeles (BS, 1945; MS, 1947, Ph.D., 1955). Her dissertation was titled A Study of the Structure of the Ionosphere.

Kallmann-Bijl was employed by RAND Corporation in Santa Monica, California (1953–1964), was a guest professor of the observatory at the University of Utrecht (1964) and served as a consultant to the United States Air Force and NASA. In time, she became a member of the National Academy of Sciences.

Kallmann-Bijl's publications focused on models of molecular composition of the Earth's atmosphere. She is best known for her theoretical extrapolation of a model of the atmosphere which gave physicists a way to calculate the lifespan of satellite using the "Kallmann Atmosphere" (the international reference atmosphere). Her models were detailed enough to include atmospheric ranges and Diurnal variation and could also be used to accurately forecast the landing spot of astronauts and cosmonauts.

Between 1949 and 1963, Kallmann-Bijl authored more than 35 papers on a variety of atmospheric subjects including ionospheric research, meteor research, high altitude research, solid propellant research, national space research and international space studies.

A searchable collection of her professional files and papers is held at the Smithsonian Institutions (NASM.1989.0042). Some of her correspondence in German and English is held by Leo Baeck Institute at the Center for Jewish History (identifier AR 4692).

=== Jewish connection ===
Although Hildegard was raised Catholic, "Under the Nuremberg Laws, Hildegard and her brother K. Frank Korf were considered 'Mischlinge zweiten Grades [mixed race],' with their Jewish ancestry from the Mossner family on their mother's side." Although their ancestry was officially described as three quarters "Aryan" and one quarter "non-Aryan," the Korfs were denied full political freedom in Germany by the 1930's.

=== Personal life ===
She was married twice, first to Curt Kallmann (divorce, 1957), whom she helped flee Germany to Stockholm, Sweden, in 1939 from persecution for his Jewish faith. Her second husband was concentration camp survivor and Vice-President of Fokker Aviation, Jan Bijl who died in 1963. Kallmann-Bijl died of a heart attack in The Hague, Netherlands, November 7, 1968.
