= Sky (crater) =

Crater on Arrokoth

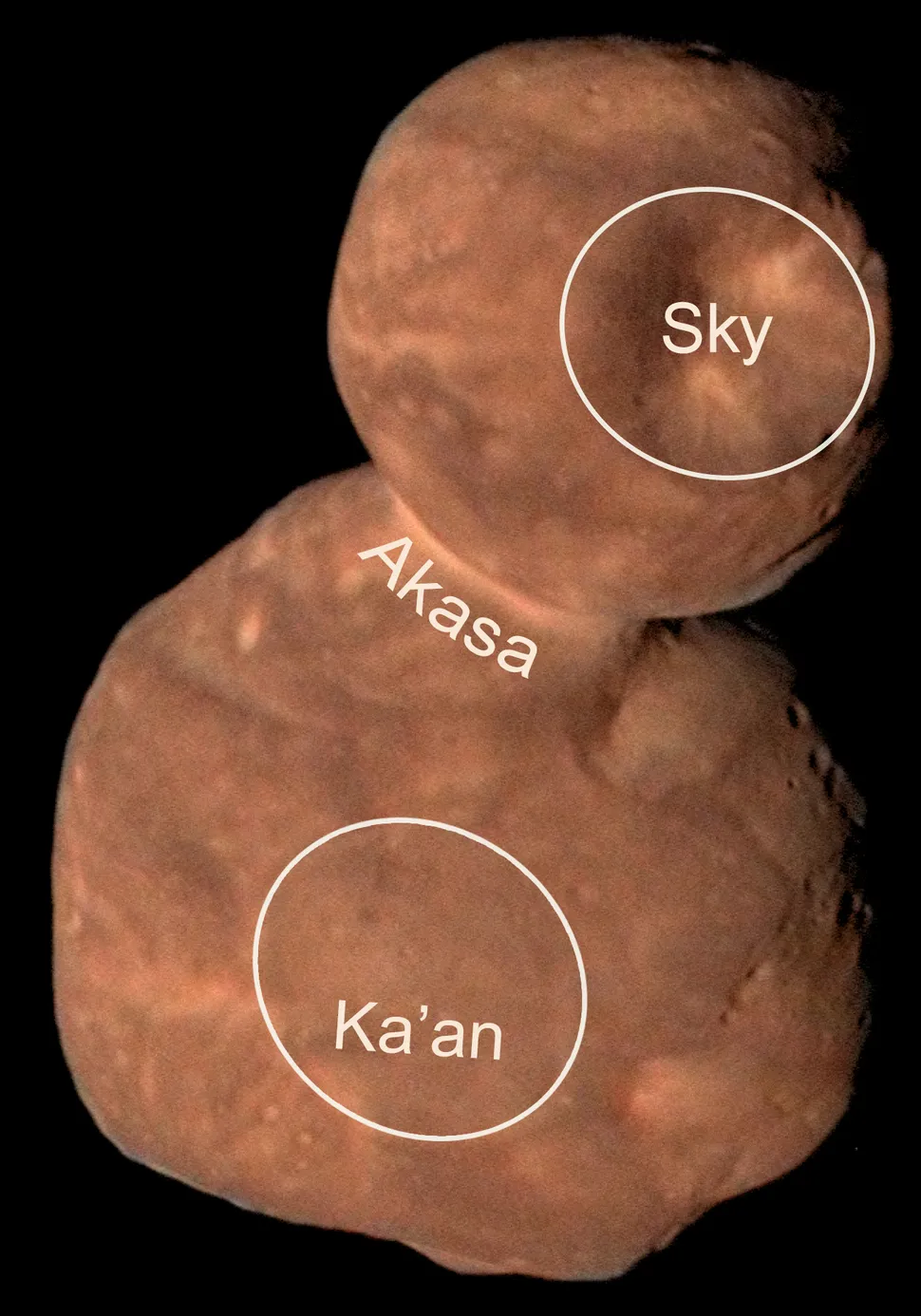
- An image showing the three prominent features on Arrokoth, including Sky on the north of the image.
- Feature type: Impact crater
- Location: Arrokoth
- Diameter: 6.8 km
- Eponym: Word for 'sky' in the English language.

Sky, is a crater on the surface of the minor planet named Arrokoth, with a diameter of 6.8 km, located at the Weeyo lobus. It is the only crater that has been found on Arrokoth's surface.

== Structure ==
Sky's impact structure has a diameter of 6.8 km, which takes up 7% of the Weeyo lobus. The hole of the impact structure is 1 km deep. The crater is considerably large, which raised the question of how Arrokoth's neck region, Akasa Collum responded to the impact.

== Naming ==
During the flyby of Arrokoth, the crater was nicknamed "Maryland" where the Johns Hopkins University Applied Physics Laboratory is located. It stayed nicknamed until it got its official name approved by the International Astronomical Union on September 2, 2021, which its name derives from the word 'sky' from the English language.
