= Hotei Arcus =

Arc-shaped landform on Titan, a moon of Saturn

- Feature type: Arcus
- Location: Titan
- Coordinates: 28.00°S 79.00°W
- Diameter: 600 km (370 mi)
- Naming: 2006
- Eponym: Budai, a Japanese Buddhist god

Hotei Arcus is a prominent arcus on Titan, a moon of Saturn.The arcus was named after Budai, the god of happiness in Japanese Buddhism. He is the god of contentment, good fortune, cheerfulness, and he is always smiling. The name "Hotei" was officially approved by the International Astronomical Union (IAU) in 2006.

== Geology and characteristics ==
It is located in Titan's Southern Hemisphere, in Hotei Regio, and is considered one of the best candidates for an active cryovolcano on Titan., Its coordinates are 28.00°S 79.00°W and it has a diameter of 600 kilometres (370 mi).
