= Arcus (planetary geology) =

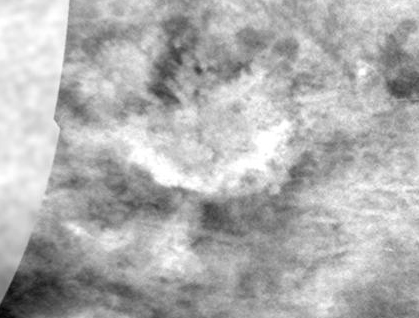
Hotei Arcus on Titan

In planetary geology, an arcus (pl. arcũs) is an arc-shaped type of landform. Arcus is the Latin word for arc.

As of 2022 the only named arcus are Hotei Arcus on Saturn's moon Titan and Kaʼan Arcus on the primitive trans-Neptunian object 486958 Arrokoth.
