= Lag deposit =

Coarse sediment without finer particles

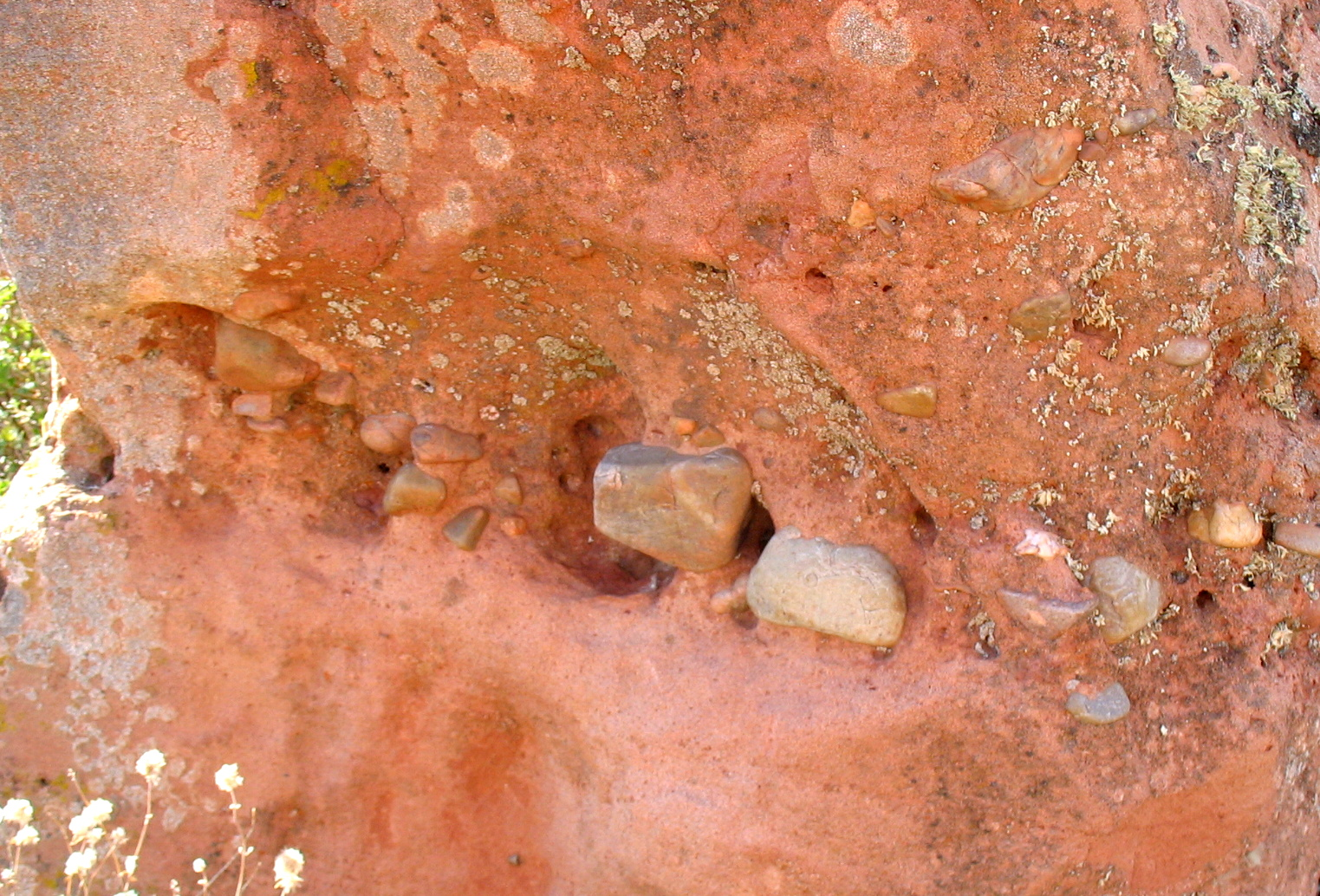
Lag deposit in Soria, Spain

A lag deposit is the deposition of material winnowed by physical action. Aeolian processes, fluvial processes, and tidal processes can remove the finer portion of a sedimentary deposit leaving the coarser material behind.

Lag deposits are found in processes such as central island formation in streams and rivers. One theory of desert pavement formation is that they are an aeolian lag deposit. Armored beaches and inlets can be composed in part by lag deposits of shells or cobbles created when tidal forces strip away the finer sand and silt.
