= Magnetospheric electric convection field =

Electric field created by impact of solar wind onto the magnetosphere

The impact of the solar wind onto the magnetosphere generates an electric field within the inner magnetosphere (r < 10 a; with a the Earth's radius) - the convection field. Its general direction is from dawn to dusk. The co-rotating thermal plasma within the inner magnetosphere drifts orthogonal to that field and to the geomagnetic field B_{o}. The generation process is not yet completely understood. One possibility is viscous interaction between solar wind and the boundary layer of the magnetosphere (magnetopause). Another process may be magnetic reconnection. Finally, a hydromagnetic dynamo process in the polar regions of the inner magnetosphere may be possible. Direct measurements via satellites have given a fairly good picture of the structure of that field. A number of models of that field exists.

A widely used model is the Volland-Stern model

== Model Description ==
It is based on two simplifying assumptions: first, a coaxial geomagnetic dipole field B is introduced. Its magnetic field lines can be represented by the shell parameter

| $L = \frac{r}{a\sin^2\theta}$ | 1 |

with r the distance from the Earth, a the Earth's radius, and θ the co-latitude. For r = a, θ is the co-latitude of the foot point of the line on the ground. L = const is the equation of a magnetic field line, and r = a L is the radial distance of the line at the geomagnetic equator (θ = 90°). Second, it is assumed that the electric field can be derived from an electrostatic potential Φ_{c}. Since in a highly conducting electric plasma like the magnetosphere, the electric fields must be orthogonal to the magnetic fields, the electric potential shell is parallel to the magnetic shell. The relation

| $\Phi_\mathrm{c} = \frac{\Phi_\mathrm{co}}{2}\left(\frac{L}{L_m}\right)^q\sin(\tau-\tau_\mathrm{co})$ | 2 |

fulfills that condition. Here $L_m = \frac{1}{\sin^2\theta_m}$ is the separatrix separating the low latitude magnetosphere with closed geomagnetic field lines at θ ≥ θ_{m} from the polar magnetosphere with open magnetic fieldlines (having only one footpoint on Earth), and τ the local time. θ_{m} ~ 20° is the polar border of the auroral zone. q, Φ_{co}, and τ_{co} are empirical parameters, to be determined from the observations. Eq.(2) yields for a coordinate system co-rotating with the Earth, its geomagnetic equator being identical with the geographic equator. Since the electric potential is symmetric with respect to the equator, only the northern hemisphere needs to be considered. The general direction of the potential is from dawn to dusk, and Φ_{co} is the total potential difference. For a transformation from a rotating magnetospheric coordinate system into a non-rotating system, τ must be replaced by the longitude -λ.

== Inner Magnetosphere ==
With the numbers q ~ 2, and Φ_{co} and τ_{co} increasing with geomagnetic activity (e.g., Φ_{co} ~ 17 and 65 kVolt, and τ_{co} ~ 0 and 1 h, during geomagnetically quiet and slightly disturbed conditions, respectively), eq.(2) valid at lower latitudes, (θ > θ_{m}) and within the inner magnetosphere (r ≤ 10 a) is the Volland-Stern model (see Fig. 1 a)).

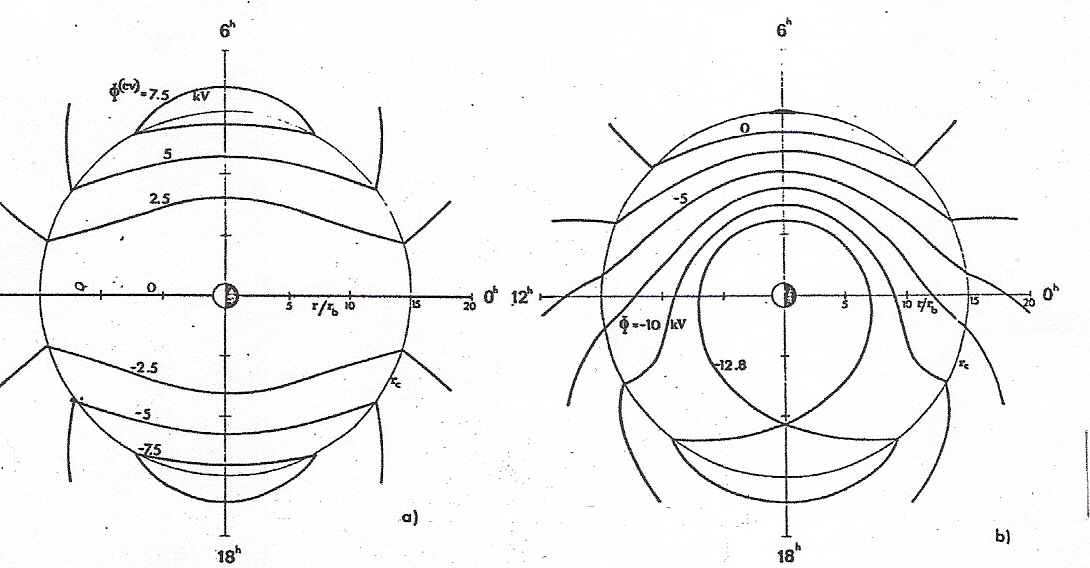
Figure 1: Equipotential lines of electric convection field within the equatorial plane of the magnetosphere (left), and superposition of the convection field with the co-rotation field (right) during magnetically quiet conditions

The use of an electrostatic field means that this model is valid only for slow temporal variations (of the order of one day or larger). The assumption of a coaxial magnetic dipole field implies that only global scale structures can be simulated. The electric field components are derived from

| $\mathbf{E} = -\nabla\Phi$ | 3 |

as

$$\begin{align}
& E_r = - \frac{q}{r}\Phi_\mathrm{c} \\
& E_\theta = \frac{2q}{r} \cot\theta~\Phi_c \\
& E_\lambda = - \frac{1}{r \sin\theta} \cot(\lambda - \lambda_\mathrm{co}) \Phi_\mathrm{co}
\end{align}$$

In the presence of the geomagnetic field an electric field is generated in a rotating on frame of reference in order to compensate for the Lorentz force. This is the so-called electric co-rotation field measured by an observer rotating with the Earth. With the simplifying conditions given above its potential is

| $\Phi_r = -\frac{\Phi_\mathrm{ro}}{L}$ | 4 |

with Φ_{ro} = 90 kVolt. The thermal plasma within the inner magnetosphere co-rotates with the Earth. In a non-rotating frame of reference, it reacts to the sum of both fields

| $\Phi_c + \Phi_r$ | 5 |

in eq.(2) and (4). Since Φ_{r} decreases with distance from the Earth while Φ_{c} increases, the configuration of the sum of both potentials has a torus-like inner region of closed equipotential shells, called the plasmasphere, in which ionized particles of thermal energy remain trapped (e.g.,). Indeed, whistler observations have revealed a plasma density within the plasmasphere several orders of magnitude larger than outside the plasmapause, which is the last closed equipotential shell (see Fig. 1b)). From the shape of the observed plasmapause configuration, the exponent q = 2 in eq.(2) has been determined, while the extent of the plasmapause decreasing with geomagnetic activity is simulated by the amplitude Φ_{co}

== Origin of Convection Field ==
The origin of the electric convection field results from the interaction between the solar wind plasma and the geomagnetic field. In the polar regions with open magnetic field lines (where the geomagnetic field merges with the interplanetary magnetic field), the solar wind flowing through the polar magnetosphere induces an electric field directed from dawn to dusk. Charge separation takes place at the magnetopause. This area is connected via the last closed shell parameter L_{m} with the ionospheric dynamo region. Thus, discharging currents flow via electric field-aligned currents (Birkeland currents) along L_{m} within the ionospheric dynamo region. The field-aligned currents flow into the ionosphere on the morning side and out of the ionosphere on the evening side. The variability of the solar wind flux determines the magnetospheric activity, generally expressed by the degree of geomagnetic activity observed on the ground.

== Polar Magnetosphere ==
The electric convection field in the near Earth polar region can be simulated by eq.(2) with the exponent q = - 1/2. At the separatrix at L_{m} ,Φ_{c} is continuous. However, a field reversal takes place accompanied by field-aligned currents, both in agreement with the observations. The electric field reversal at L_{m} clearly indicates a reversal of the plasma drift within the inner and the polar magnetosphere. In a more sophisticated model, the auroral oval between about 15° and 20°colatitude (again simulated by a coaxial auroral zone), as a transition zone between the field reversal, has been taken into account. The ionospheric dynamo region between about 100 to 200 km altitude is a region where ions and electrons have different mobility. Thus the plasma becomes electrically conducting. Due to the geomagnetic field, two kinds of electric currents exist: Pedersen currents parallel to E, and Hall currents orthogonal to E and B. Moreover, a significant enhancement of the electric conductivity within the aurora area depending on geomagnetic activity exists which influences the parameter τ_{co} in eq.(2)

The electric convection field drives strong electric currents within the polar dynamo regions (e.g. DP1 and DP2) which can be simulated by the model. Manifestations of upper atmospheric electric currents are the corresponding magnetic variations on the ground. Unfortunately, this connection is unique only for horizontally flowing current systems. E.g., the vertically flowing field-aligned currents have almost no magnetic effect on the ground. The model allows to separate the contributions of both kinds of electric currents. The polar magnetic disturbances DP2 are mainly Hall currents. The auroral electrojets (DP1) with magnitudes of the order of several hundreds of kA flowing within the aurora zones consist of Hall currents and Pedersen currents. Dissipation of the Pedersen currents produces Joule heating which is transferred to the neutral gas of the thermosphere thus generating thermospheric and ionospheric disturbances. Longer-lasting magnetospheric disturbances of the order of several hours to days can develop into global-scale thermospheric and ionospheric storms (e.g.,). During major magnetospheric disturbances, large amounts of ionospheric plasma are transported into the polar ionosphere by the electric convection fields , causing severe ionospheric anomalies and impacting space weather.

== See also ==
- Corotation electric field
