= Atmospheric tide =

Global-scale periodic oscillations of the atmosphere

Atmospheric tides are global-scale periodic oscillations of the atmosphere. In many ways they are analogous to ocean tides. They can be excited by:

- The regular day-night cycle in the Sun's heating of the atmosphere (insolation)
- The gravitational field pull of the Moon
- Non-linear interactions between tides and planetary waves
- Large-scale latent heat release due to deep convection in the tropics

== General characteristics ==
The largest-amplitude atmospheric tides are mostly generated in the troposphere and stratosphere when the atmosphere is periodically heated, as water vapor and ozone absorb solar radiation during the day. These tides propagate away from the source regions and ascend into the mesosphere and thermosphere. Atmospheric tides can be measured as regular fluctuations in wind, temperature, density and pressure. Although atmospheric tides share much in common with ocean tides they have two key distinguishing features:

1. Atmospheric tides are primarily excited by the Sun's heating of the atmosphere whereas ocean tides are excited by the Moon's gravitational pull and to a lesser extent by the Sun's gravity. This means that most atmospheric tides have periods of oscillation related to the 24-hour length of the solar day whereas ocean tides have periods of oscillation related both to the solar day as well as to the longer tidal lunar day (time between successive lunar transits) of about 24 hours 51 minutes.
2. Atmospheric tides propagate in an atmosphere where density varies significantly with height. A consequence of this is that their amplitudes naturally increase exponentially as the tide ascends into progressively more rarefied regions of the atmosphere (for an explanation of this phenomenon, see below). In contrast, the density of the oceans varies only slightly with depth and so there the tides do not necessarily vary in amplitude with depth.

At ground level, atmospheric tides can be detected as regular but small oscillations in surface pressure with periods of 24 and 12 hours. However, at greater heights, the amplitudes of the tides can become very large. In the mesosphere (heights of about 50–100 km (30–60 mi; 200,000–300,000 ft)) atmospheric tides can reach amplitudes of more than 50 m/s and are often the most significant part of the motion of the atmosphere.

The reason for this dramatic growth in amplitude from tiny fluctuations near the ground to oscillations that dominate the motion of the mesosphere lies in the fact that the density of the atmosphere decreases with increasing height. As tides or waves propagate upwards, they move into regions of lower and lower density. If the tide or wave is not dissipating, then its kinetic energy density must be conserved. Since the density is decreasing, the amplitude of the tide or wave increases correspondingly so that energy is conserved.

Following this growth with height atmospheric tides have much larger amplitudes in the middle and upper atmosphere than they do at ground level.

== Solar atmospheric tides ==
The largest amplitude atmospheric tides are generated by the periodic heating of the atmosphere by the Sun – the atmosphere is heated during the day and not heated at night. This regular diurnal (daily) cycle in heating generates thermal tides that have periods related to the solar day. It might initially be expected that this diurnal heating would give rise to tides with a period of 24 hours, corresponding to the heating's periodicity. However, observations reveal that large amplitude tides are generated with periods of 24 and 12 hours. Tides have also been observed with periods of 8 and 6 hours, although these latter tides generally have smaller amplitudes. This set of periods occurs because the solar heating of the atmosphere occurs in an approximate half-wave rectified sine wave profile and so is rich in harmonics. When this pattern is decomposed into separate frequency components using a Fourier transform, as well as the mean and daily (24-hour) variation, significant oscillations with periods of 12, 8 and 6 hours are produced. Tides generated by the gravitational effect of the Sun are very much smaller than those generated by solar heating. Solar tides will refer to only thermal solar tides from this point.

Solar energy is absorbed throughout the atmosphere some of the most significant in this context are water vapor at about 0–15 km in the troposphere, ozone at about 30–60 km in the stratosphere and molecular oxygen and molecular nitrogen at about 120–170 km) in the thermosphere. Variations in the global distribution and density of these species result in changes in the amplitude of the solar tides. The tides are also affected by the environment through which they travel.

Solar tides can be separated into two components: migrating and non-migrating.

=== Migrating solar tides ===
Figure 1. Tidal temperature and wind perturbations at 100 km altitude for September 2005 as a function of universal time. The animation is based upon observations from the SABER and TIDI instruments on board the TIMED satellite. It shows the superposition of the most important diurnal and semidiurnal tidal components (migrating and nonmigrating).

Migrating tides are Sun synchronous – from the point of view of a stationary observer on the ground they propagate westwards with the apparent motion of the Sun. As the migrating tides stay fixed relative to the Sun a pattern of excitation is formed that is also fixed relative to the Sun. Changes in the tide observed from a stationary viewpoint on the Earth's surface are caused by the rotation of the Earth with respect to this fixed pattern. Seasonal variations of the tides also occur as the Earth tilts relative to the Sun and so relative to the pattern of excitation.

The migrating solar tides have been extensively studied both through observations and mechanistic models.

=== Non-migrating solar tides ===
Non-migrating tides can be thought of as global-scale waves with the same periods as the migrating tides. However, non-migrating tides do not follow the apparent motion of the Sun. Either they do not propagate horizontally, they propagate eastwards or they propagate westwards at a different speed to the Sun. These non-migrating tides may be generated by differences in topography with longitude, land-sea contrast, and surface interactions. An important source is latent heat release due to deep convection in the tropics.

The primary source for the 24-hr tide is in the lower atmosphere where surface effects are important. This is reflected in a relatively large non-migrating component seen in longitudinal differences in tidal amplitudes. Largest amplitudes have been observed over South America, Africa and Australia.

== Lunar atmospheric tides ==
Atmospheric tides are also produced through the gravitational effects of the Moon. Lunar (gravitational) tides are much weaker than solar thermal tides and are generated by the motion of the Earth's oceans (caused by the Moon) and to a lesser extent the effect of the Moon's gravitational attraction on the atmosphere.

== Classical tidal theory ==
The basic characteristics of the atmospheric tides are described by the classical tidal theory. By neglecting mechanical forcing and dissipation, the classical tidal theory assumes that atmospheric wave motions can be considered as linear perturbations of an initially motionless zonal mean state that is horizontally stratified and isothermal. The two major results of the classical theory are

- atmospheric tides are eigenmodes of the atmosphere described by Hough functions
- amplitudes grow exponentially with height.

=== Basic equations ===
The primitive equations lead to the linearized equations for perturbations (primed variables) in a spherical isothermal atmosphere:

- horizontal momentum equations
  $$\begin{array}{rrl}
\frac{\partial u'}{\partial t} \, - \, 2 \Omega \sin \varphi \, v'
\, + & \frac{1}{a \, \cos \varphi} \, \frac{\partial \Phi'}{\partial \lambda} & = 0 \\
\frac{\partial v'}{\partial t} \, + \, 2 \Omega \sin \varphi \, u' \, +
& \frac{1}{a} \, \frac{\partial \Phi'}{\partial \varphi} & =  0
\end{array}$$
- energy equation
  $$\frac{\partial^2}{\partial t \partial z} \Phi' \, + \,  N^2 w' = \frac{\kappa J'}{H}$$
- continuity equation
  $$\frac{1}{a \, \cos \varphi} \, \left( \frac{\partial u'}{\partial \lambda} \, + \,
\frac{\partial}{\partial \varphi} (v' \, \cos \varphi) \right) \, + \,
\frac{1}{\varrho_o} \, \frac{\partial}{\partial z} (\varrho_o w') = 0$$

with the definitions

- $u$ eastward zonal wind
- $v$ northward meridional wind
- $w$ upward vertical wind
- $\Phi$ geopotential, $\int g(z,\varphi) \, dz$
- $N^2$ square of Brunt-Vaisala (buoyancy) frequency
- $\Omega$ angular velocity of the Earth
- $\varrho_o$ density $\propto \exp(-z/H)$
- $z$ altitude
- $\lambda$ geographic longitude
- $\varphi$ geographic latitude
- $J$ heating rate per unit mass
- $a$ radius of the Earth
- $g$ gravity acceleration
- $H$ constant scale height
- $t$ time

=== Separation of variables ===
The set of equations can be solved for atmospheric tides, i.e., longitudinally propagating waves of zonal wavenumber $s$ and frequency $\sigma$. Zonal wavenumber $s$ is a positive integer so that positive values for $\sigma$ correspond to eastward propagating tides and negative values to westward propagating tides. A separation approach of the form

$$\begin{align}
\Phi'(\varphi, \lambda, z, t) &= \hat{\Phi}(\varphi,z) \, e^{i(s\lambda - \sigma t)} \\
\hat{\Phi}(\varphi,z) &= \sum_n \Theta_n (\varphi) \, G_n(z)
\end{align}$$

and doing some manipulations yields expressions for the latitudinal and vertical structure of the tides.

=== Laplace's tidal equation ===
The latitudinal structure of the tides is described by the horizontal structure equation which is also called Laplace's tidal equation:

$${L} {\Theta}_n + \varepsilon_n {\Theta}_n = 0$$

with Laplace operator

$${L}=\frac{\partial}{\partial \mu} \left[ \frac{(1-\mu^2)}{(\eta^2 - \mu^2)} \,
\frac{\partial}{\partial \mu} \right] - \frac{1}{\eta^2 - \mu^2} \,
\left[ -\frac{s}{\eta} \, \frac{(\eta^2 + \mu^2)}{(\eta^2 - \mu^2)} +
\frac{s^2}{1-\mu^2} \right]$$

using $\mu = \sin \varphi$, $\eta= \sigma / (2 \Omega)$ and eigenvalue

$$\varepsilon_n = (2 \Omega a)^2 / gh_n.$$

Hence, atmospheric tides are eigenoscillations (eigenmodes) of Earth's atmosphere with eigenfunctions $\Theta_n$, called Hough functions, and eigenvalues $\varepsilon_n$. The latter define the equivalent depth $h_n$ which couples the latitudinal structure of the tides with their vertical structure.

=== General solution of Laplace's equation ===
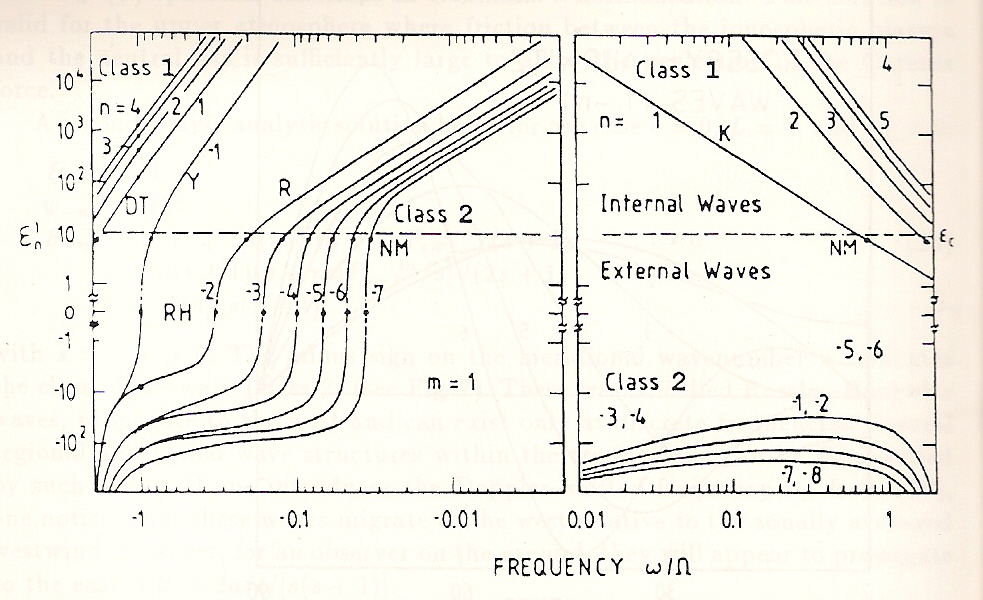
Figure 2. Eigenvalue ε of wave modes of zonal wave number s = 1 vs. normalized frequency ν = ω/Ω where Ω = 7.27×10^{−5} s^{−1} is the angular frequency of one solar day. Waves with positive (negative) frequencies propagate to the east (west). The horizontal dashed line is at ε_{c} ≃ 11 and indicates the transition from internal to external waves. Meaning of the symbols: 'RH' Rossby-Haurwitz waves (ε = 0); 'Y' Yanai waves; 'K' Kelvin waves; 'R' Rossby waves; 'DT' Diurnal tides (ν = −1); 'NM' Normal modes (ε ≃ ε_{c})

Longuet-Higgins has completely solved Laplace's equations and has discovered tidal modes with negative eigenvalues ε s
n (Figure 2). There exist two kinds of waves: class 1 waves, (sometimes called gravity waves), labelled by positive n, and class 2 waves (sometimes called rotational waves), labelled by negative n. Class 2 waves owe their existence to the Coriolis force and can only exist for periods greater than 12 hours (or |ν| ≤ 2). Tidal waves can be either internal (travelling waves) with positive eigenvalues (or equivalent depth) which have finite vertical wavelengths and can transport wave energy upward, or external (evanescent waves) with negative eigenvalues and infinitely large vertical wavelengths meaning that their phases remain constant with altitude. These external wave modes cannot transport wave energy, and their amplitudes decrease exponentially with height outside their source regions. Even numbers of n correspond to waves symmetric with respect to the equator, and odd numbers corresponding to antisymmetric waves. The transition from internal to external waves appears at ε ≃ ε_{c}, or at the vertical wavenumber k_{z} = 0, and λ_{z} ⇒ ∞, respectively.

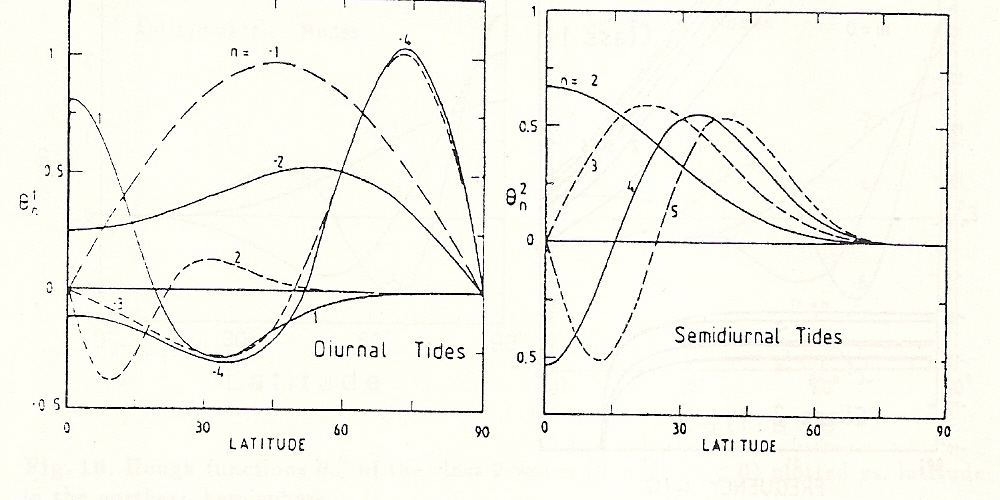
Figure 3. Pressure amplitudes vs. latitude of the Hough functions of the diurnal tide (s = 1; ν = −1) (left) and of the semidiurnal tides (s = 2; ν = −2) (right) on the northern hemisphere. Solid curves: symmetric waves; dashed curves: antisymmetric waves

The fundamental solar diurnal tidal mode which optimally matches the solar heat input configuration and thus is most strongly excited is the Hough mode (1, −2) (Figure 3). It depends on local time and travels westward with the Sun. It is an external mode of class 2 and has the eigenvalue of ε 1
−2 = −12.56. Its maximum pressure amplitude on the ground is about 60 Pa. The largest solar semidiurnal wave is mode (2, 2) with maximum pressure amplitudes at the ground of 120 Pa. It is an internal class 1 wave. Its amplitude increases exponentially with altitude. Although its solar excitation is half of that of mode (1, −2), its amplitude on the ground is larger by a factor of two. This indicates the effect of suppression of external waves, in this case by a factor of four.

=== Vertical structure equation ===
For bounded solutions and at altitudes above the forcing region, the vertical structure equation in its canonical form is:

$$\frac{\partial^2 G^{\star}_n}{\partial x^2} \, + \, \alpha_n^2 \, G^{\star}_n = F_n(x)$$

with solution

$$G^{\star}_n (x) \sim \begin{cases}
e^{-|\alpha_n| x} & \text{:} \, \alpha_n^2 < 0, \, \text{ evanescent or trapped} \\
e^{i \alpha_n x} & \text{:} \, \alpha_n^2 > 0, \, \text{ propagating}\\
e^{\left( \kappa - \frac{1}{2} \right) x} &  \text{:} \, h_n = H / (1- \kappa), F_n(x)=0 \, \forall x, \, \text{ Lamb waves (free solutions)}
\end{cases}$$

using the definitions

$$\begin{align}
\alpha_n^2 &= \frac{\kappa H}{h_n} - \frac{1}{4} \\
x &= \frac{z}{H} \\
G^{\star}_n &= G_n \, \varrho_o^{\frac{1}{2}} \, N^{-1} \\
F_n(x) & = - \frac{\varrho_o^{-\frac{1}{2}}}{i \sigma N} \, \frac{\partial}{\partial x} (\varrho_o J_n).
\end{align}$$

=== Propagating solutions ===
Therefore, each wavenumber/frequency pair (a tidal component) is a superposition of associated Hough functions (often called tidal modes in the literature) of index n. The nomenclature is such that a negative value of n refers to evanescent modes (no vertical propagation) and a positive value to propagating modes. The equivalent depth $h_n$ is linked to the vertical wavelength $\lambda_{z,n}$, since $\alpha_n / H$ is the vertical wavenumber:

$$\lambda_{z,n} = \frac{2 \pi \, H}{\alpha_n} =
\frac{2 \pi \, H}{ \sqrt{\frac{\kappa H}{h_n} - \frac{1}{4}}}.$$

For propagating solutions $(\alpha_n^2 > 0)$, the vertical group velocity

$$c_{gz,n}=H \frac{\partial \sigma}{\partial \alpha_n}$$

becomes positive (upward energy propagation) only if $\alpha_n > 0$ for westward $(\sigma < 0)$ or if $\alpha_n < 0$ for eastward $(\sigma >0)$ propagating waves. At a given height $x=z/H$, the wave maximizes for

$$K_n = s\lambda + \alpha_n x - \sigma t = 0.$$

For a fixed longitude $\lambda$, this in turn always results in downward phase progression as time progresses, independent of the propagation direction. This is an important result for the interpretation of observations: downward phase progression in time means an upward propagation of energy and therefore a tidal forcing lower in the atmosphere. Amplitude increases with height $\propto e^{z/2H}$, as density decreases.

== Dissipation ==
Damping of the tides occurs primarily in the lower thermosphere region, and may be caused by turbulence from breaking gravity waves. A similar phenomenon to ocean waves breaking on a beach, the energy dissipates into the background atmosphere. Molecular diffusion also becomes increasingly important at higher levels in the lower thermosphere as the mean free path increases in the rarefied atmosphere.

At thermospheric heights, attenuation of atmospheric waves, mainly due to collisions between the neutral gas and the ionospheric plasma, becomes significant so that at above about 150 km altitude, all wave modes gradually become external waves, and the Hough functions degenerate to spherical functions; e.g., mode (1, −2) develops to the spherical function P 1
1 (θ), mode (2, 2) becomes P 2
2 (θ), with θ the co-latitude, etc. Within the thermosphere, mode (1, −2) is the predominant mode reaching diurnal temperature amplitudes at the exosphere of at least 140 K and horizontal winds of the order of 100 m/s and more increasing with geomagnetic activity. It is responsible for the electric Sq currents within the ionospheric dynamo region between about 100 and 200 km altitude. Both diurnal and semidiurnal tides can be observed across the ionospheric dynamo region with incoherent scatter radars by tracking the tidal motion of ionospheric plasma.

== Effects of atmospheric tide ==
The tides form an important mechanism for transporting energy from the lower atmosphere into the upper atmosphere, while dominating the dynamics of the mesosphere and lower thermosphere. Therefore, understanding the atmospheric tides is essential in understanding the atmosphere as a whole. Modeling and observations of atmospheric tides are needed in order to monitor and predict changes in the Earth's atmosphere.

== See also ==
- Atmospheric wave
- Tide
- Earth tide
- Mesosphere
- Thermosphere
- Ionospheric dynamo region
