= Secondary circulation =

Circulation induced in a rotating system

In fluid dynamics, a secondary circulation or secondary flow is a weak circulation that plays a key maintenance role in sustaining a stronger primary circulation that contains most of the kinetic energy and momentum of a flow. For example, a tropical cyclone's primary winds are tangential (horizontally swirling), but its evolution and maintenance against friction involves an in-up-out secondary circulation flow that is also important to its clouds and rain. On a planetary scale, Earth's winds are mostly east–west or zonal, but that flow is maintained against friction by the Coriolis force acting on a small north–south or meridional secondary circulation.

== See also ==
- Hough function
- Primitive equations
- Secondary flow
