= Collapsing can =

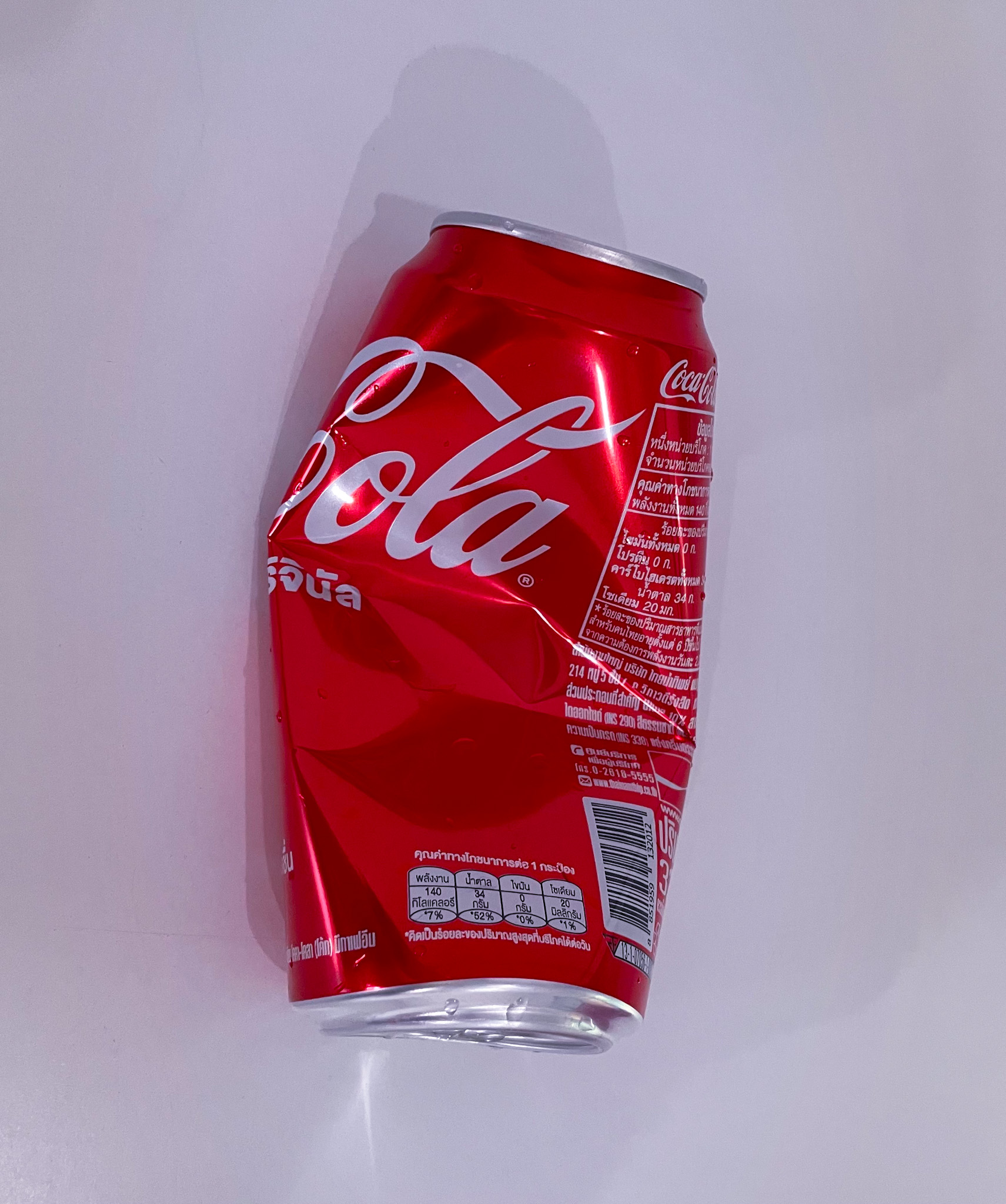
Crushed Coca Cola's aluminum can

Collapsing can or can crusher experiment is a demonstration of an aluminum can being crushed by atmospheric pressure. Due to the low pressure inside a can as compared to the pressure outside, the pressure outside exerts a force on the can causing the can to collapse.

== Explanation ==
The demonstration starts with boiling water inside the can. As the water is boiled, water vapor is created and fills the space inside the can which then pushes the air out.

H_{2}O_{(l)} → H_{2}O_{(g)}

Then, inverting a water vapor-filled can into a water bath causes the water vapor to rapidly condense back to liquid water. The condensation of water reduces pressure inside the can, so the higher pressure outside the can makes the can collapse.

H_{2}O_{(g)} → H_{2}O_{(l)}

== Limitation ==
Since the can is open when immersed, this demonstration only works with aluminum cans. Aluminum cools quickly when immersed, causing almost instantaneous condensation of the steam, leading the weak aluminum to collapse. With steel cans the water in the cooling bath condenses the interior steam by contact through the opening in the can. Then the cooling water is drawn inside the can by the reduced pressure preventing the collapse of the can. The steam condenses before the steel cools.

A variation where the opening in the can is sealed air-tight can make even a strong a steel drum collapse. After the water inside the drum boils and forces the air out, the opening is sealed air tight. When the steam condenses the can, or drum, will be crushed by the pressure differential between the internal partial pressure of water, and the external atmosphere.

== Alternatives ==
Addition of sodium hydroxide to a can filled with carbon dioxide can produce a similar result.

== Gallery ==
A video of collapsing can experiment

A video of collapsing can experiment
