= Sydney Samuel Hough =

British mathematician and astronomer (1870–1923)

Sydney Samuel Hough FRS (11 June 1870, Stoke Newington – 8 July 1923, Gerrards Cross, Buckinghamshire) was a British applied mathematician and astronomer.

Hough studied at Christ's Hospital and then obtained a scholarship to Cambridge. He graduated in 1892 B.A. and in 1896 M.A. from St John's College, Cambridge and was a Fellow there from 1895 to 1901. He was an assistant master at Winchester College in 1894.

At South Africa's Royal Observatory, Cape of Good Hope, he was from 1898 to 1907 the chief assistant (Note: Hough's predecessor as chief assistant was William Henry Finlay) of David Gill and, upon Gill's retirement in 1906, the director from 1907 to 1923. When he first joined Gill, Hough was outstanding in applied mathematics but had little experience in practical astronomy — however, Hough learned quickly from Gill and provided valuable assistance. Hough concentrated on the completion of Gill's programme and compiled five of the twelve volumes of the Southern African part of the Carte du Ciel. Hough measured with high accuracy the positions of more than 20,000 stars.

Hough was awarded The William Hopkins Prize in 1900 from the Cambridge Philosophical Society.

Hough was elected in 1899 a Fellow of the Royal Society of South Africa and in 1902 a Fellow of the Royal Society. In 1908 became the first President of the Royal Society of South Africa. His mathematical work was mainly concerned with the theory of tides.

== See also ==
- Hough function
