= Corotation electric field =

In plasma astrophysics, the corotation electric field is the electric field due to the rotation of a magnet. For example, the rotation of the Earth results in a corotation electric field.

== See also ==
- Magnetospheric electric convection field
