= Anacoustic zone =

The anacoustic zone, also known as the zone of silence, is the region of the atmosphere of Earth above about 160 kilometers (99 mi) where the air density becomes so low that air molecules are not close enough to support transmission of sound waves within the hearing range.

As altitude increases through the atmosphere, the first sound waves to disappear are the high pitched, high-frequency (short wavelength) ones. At a certain altitude (roughly 160 kilometers (99 mi)) even the lowest frequency tone that can be heard by a human being (around 20 Hz) no longer can be transmitted.

With increasing height, the atmosphere becomes more rarefied, which increases the mean time between collisions of molecules (also known as mean free time). The maximum frequency a sound wave can have and still be able to propagate in a gas is roughly the inverse of the mean free time (molecular mean free path divided by average molecular speed). Hence the more rarefied a gas medium, the lower is the maximum frequency for sound propagation in that medium.
