= Hough function =

Mathematical function describing fluid motion

In applied mathematics, the Hough functions are the eigenfunctions of Laplace's tidal equations which govern fluid motion on a rotating sphere. As such, they are relevant in geophysics and meteorology where they form part of the solutions for atmospheric and ocean waves. These functions are named in honour of Sydney Samuel Hough.

Each Hough mode is a function of latitude and may be expressed as an infinite sum of associated Legendre polynomials; the functions are orthogonal over the sphere in the continuous case. Thus they can also be thought of as a generalized Fourier series in which the basis functions are the normal modes of an atmosphere at rest.

== See also ==
- Secondary circulation
- Legendre polynomials
- Primitive equations
