= Diffusion-limited escape =

Escape of gases from the atmosphere

Diffusion-limited escape occurs when the rate of atmospheric escape to space is limited by the upward diffusion of escaping gases through the upper atmosphere, and not by escape mechanisms at the top of the atmosphere (the exobase). The escape of any atmospheric gas can be diffusion-limited, but only diffusion-limited escape of hydrogen has been observed in the Solar System, on Earth, Mars, Venus and Titan. Diffusion-limited hydrogen escape was likely important for the rise of oxygen in Earth's atmosphere (the Great Oxidation Event) and can be used to estimate the oxygen and hydrogen content of Earth's prebiotic atmosphere.

Diffusion-limited escape theory was first used by Donald Hunten in 1973 to describe hydrogen escape on one of Saturn's moons, Titan. The following year, in 1974, Hunten found that the diffusion-limited escape theory agreed with observations of hydrogen escape on Earth. Diffusion-limited escape theory is now used widely to model the composition of exoplanet atmospheres and Earth's ancient atmosphere.

== Diffusion-Limited Escape of Hydrogen on Earth ==
A diagram showing that hydrogen diffusion in the upper atmosphere is the bottleneck for hydrogen escape on Earth, following from that given in Catling and Kasting (2017), p. 147.

Hydrogen escape on Earth occurs at ~500 km altitude at the exobase (the lower border of the exosphere) where gases are collisionless. Hydrogen atoms at the exobase exceeding the escape velocity escape to space without colliding into another gas particle.

For a hydrogen atom to escape from the exobase, it must first travel upward through the atmosphere from the troposphere. Near ground level, hydrogen in the form of H_{2}O, H_{2}, and CH_{4} travels upward in the homosphere through turbulent mixing, which dominates up to the homopause. At about 17 km altitude, the cold tropopause (known as the "cold trap") freezes out most of the H_{2}O vapor that travels through it, preventing the upward mixing of some hydrogen. In the upper homosphere, hydrogen bearing molecules are split by ultraviolet photons leaving only H and H_{2} behind. The H and H_{2} diffuse upward through the heterosphere to the exobase where they escape the atmosphere by Jeans thermal escape and/or a number of suprathermal mechanisms. On Earth, the rate-limiting step or "bottleneck" for hydrogen escape is diffusion through the heterosphere. Therefore, hydrogen escape on Earth is diffusion-limited.

By considering one dimensional molecular diffusion of H_{2} through a heavier background atmosphere, you can derive a formula for the upward diffusion-limited flux of hydrogen ($\Phi_{l}$):

$$\Phi_l = Cf_T(\mathrm{H})$$

$C$ is a constant for a particular background atmosphere and planet, and $f_T(H)$is the total hydrogen mixing ratio in all its forms above the tropopause. You can calculate $f_T(\mathrm{H})$by summing all hydrogen bearing species weighted by the number of hydrogen atoms each species contains:

$$f_T(\mathrm{H})=f_\mathrm{H}+2f_\mathrm{H_2}+2f_\mathrm{H_2O}+4f_\mathrm{CH_4}+...$$

For Earth's atmosphere, $C=2.5\times 10^{13}$cm^{−2}⋅s^{−1}, and, the concentration of hydrogen bearing gases above the tropopause is 1.8 ppmv (parts per million by volume) CH_{4}, 3 ppmv H_{2}O, and 0.55 ppmv H_{2}. Plugging these numbers into the formulas above gives a predicted diffusion-limited hydrogen escape rate of $\Phi_l = 4.3\times 10^8$H atoms cm^{−2}⋅s^{−1}. This calculated hydrogen flux agrees with measurements of hydrogen escape.

Note that hydrogen is the only gas in Earth's atmosphere that escapes at the diffusion-limit. Helium escape is not diffusion-limited and instead escapes by a suprathermal process known as the polar wind.

== Derivation ==
Transport of gas molecules in the atmosphere occurs by two mechanisms: molecular and eddy diffusion. Molecular diffusion is the transport of molecules from an area of higher concentration to lower concentration due to thermal motion. Eddy diffusion is the transport of molecules by the turbulent mixing of a gas. The sum of molecular and eddy diffusion fluxes give the total flux of a gas $i$ through the atmosphere:

$$\Phi_i = \Phi_i^\text{mol}+\Phi_i^\text{eddy}$$

The vertical eddy diffusion flux is given by

$$\Phi_i^\text{eddy}=-Kn\frac{df_i}{dz}$$

$K$ is the eddy diffusion coefficient, $n$ is the number density of the atmosphere (molecules cm^{−3}), and $f_i$ is the volume mixing ratio of gas $i$. The above formula for eddy diffusion is a simplification for how gases actually mix in the atmosphere. The eddy diffusion coefficient can only be empirically derived from atmospheric tracer studies.

The molecular diffusion flux, on the other hand, can be derived from theory. The general formula for the diffusion of gas 1 relative to gas 2 is given by

$$\vec{v}_1-\vec{v}_2=-D_{12}\left(\frac{n^2}{n_1n_2}\nabla\left(\frac{n_1}{n}\right)+\frac{m_2-m_1}{m} \nabla(\ln{P})+\alpha_T \nabla (\ln{T})-\frac{m_1m_2}{mkT}(\vec{a}_1-\vec{a}_2) \right)$$

Variable	Definition
$\vec{v}_1$, $\vec{v}_2$	velocity of gas 1, 2 (cm s^{−1})
$w_1$, $w_2$	vertical velocity of gas 1, 2 (cm s^{−1})
$D_{12}$	binary diffusion coefficient (cm^{2} s^{−1} molecules^{−1})
$b_{12}$	binary diffusion parameter ($2.6\times 10^{19}$ cm^{−1} s^{−1} for H)
$n_1$and $n_2$	number densities of gas 1 and 2 (molecules cm^{−3})
$n$	$n_1+n_2$(molecules cm^{−3})
$f_1$	mixing ratio of gas 1
$m_1$and $m_2$	molecular mass of gas 1 and 2 (in kg molecule^{−1})
$m$	$(n_1 m_1 +n_1m_2)/(n_1+n_2)$
$k$	Boltzmann constant ($1.38 \times 10^{-23}$J K^{−1})
$T$	Temperature (K)
$\vec{a}_1$and $\vec{a}_2$	acceleration of gas 1 and 2 from gravity, electric fields, etc. (cm s^{−2})
$g$	gravitational acceleration (9.81 m s^{−2} on Earth)
$\alpha_T$	thermal diffusivity (~-0.25 for H or H_{2} in air)
$P$	air pressure (Pa)

Each variable is defined in table on right. The terms on the right hand side of the formula account for diffusion due to molecular concentration, pressure, temperature, and force gradients respectively. The expression above ultimately comes from the Boltzmann transport equation. We can simplify the above equation considerably with several assumptions. We will consider only vertical diffusion, and a neutral gas such that the accelerations are both equal to gravity ($\vec{a}_1=\vec{a}_2=g$) so the last term cancels. We are left with

$$w_1-w_2=-D_{12}\left(\frac{n^2}{n_1n_2}\frac{d}{dz}\left(\frac{n_1}{n}\right)+\frac{m_2-m_1}{m} \frac{d}{dz}(\ln{P})+\alpha_T \frac{d}{dz} (\ln{T})\right)$$

We are interested in the diffusion of a lighter molecule (e.g. hydrogen) through a stationary heavier background gas (air). Therefore, we can take velocity of the heavy background gas to be zero: $w_2=0$. We can also use the chain rule and the hydrostatic equation to rewrite the derivative in the second term.

$$\frac{d}{dz}\ln {P}=\frac{1}{P}\frac{dP}{dz}=\frac{-mg}{kT}$$

The chain rule can also be used to simplify the derivative in the third term.

$$\frac{d}{dz}\ln{T}=\frac{1}{T}\frac{dT}{dz}$$

Making these substitutions gives

$$w_1=-D_{12}\left(\frac{n^2}{n_1n_2}\frac{df_1}{dz}+\frac{(m_2-m_1)g}{kT}+\frac{\alpha_T}{T} \frac{dT}{dz} \right)$$

Note that we have also made the substitution $n_1/n=f_1$. The flux of molecular diffusion is given by

$$\Phi_1^\text{mol}=w_1n_1=-D_{12}n_1\left(\frac{n^2}{n_1n_2}\frac{df_1}{dz}+\frac{(m_2-m_1)g}{kT}+\frac{\alpha_T}{T} \frac{dT}{dz} \right)$$

By adding the molecular diffusion flux and the eddy diffusion flux, we get the total flux of molecule 1 through the background gas

$$\Phi_1 = \Phi_1^\text{mol}+\Phi_1^\text{eddy}=-Kn\frac{df_1}{dz}-D_{12}n_1\left(\frac{n^2}{n_1n_2}\frac{df_1}{dz}+\frac{(m_2-m_1)g}{kT}+\frac{\alpha_T}{T} \frac{dT}{dz} \right)$$

Temperature gradients are fairly small in the heterosphere, so $dT/dz\approx0$, which leaves us with

$$\Phi_1 = -Kn\frac{df_1}{dz}-D_{12}n_1\left(\frac{n^2}{n_1n_2}\frac{df_1}{dz}+\frac{(m_2-m_1)g}{kT}\right)$$

The maximum flux of gas 1 occurs when $df_1/dz=0$. Qualitatively, this is because $f_1$ must decrease with altitude in order to contribute to the upward flux of gas 1. If $f_1$ decreases with altitude, then $n_1$ must decrease rapidly with altitude (recall that $f_1=n_1/n$). Rapidly decreasing $n_1$ would require rapidly increasing $w_1$ in order to drive a constant upward flux of gas 1 (recall $\Phi_1=w_1n_1$). Rapidly increasing $w_1$ isn't physically possible. For a mathematical explanation for why $df_1/dz=0$, see Walker 1977, p. 160. The maximum flux of gas 1 relative to gas 2 ($\Phi_l$, which occurs when $df_1/dz=0$) is therefore

$$\Phi_l = D_{12}n_1\left(\frac{(m_2-m_1)g}{kT}\right)$$

Since $D_{12}=b_{12}/n$,

$$\Phi_l =\frac{b_{12}g(m_2-m_1)}{kT}\frac{n_1}{n}=\frac{b_{12}g(m_2-m_1)}{kT}f_1$$

or

$$\Phi_l =Cf_1$$

This is the diffusion-limited flux of a molecule. For any particular atmosphere, $C$ is a constant. For hydrogen (gas 1) diffusion through air (gas 2) in the heterosphere on Earth $m_\text{air}-m_\text{hydrogen}\approx 4.8 \times 10^{-26}$, $g=9.81$m⋅s^{−2}, and $T\approx 208$ K. Both H and H_{2} diffuse through the heterosphere, so we will use a diffusion parameter that is the weighted sum of H and H_{2} number densities at the tropopause.

$$b_{12}=b_\mathrm{H}\frac{n_\mathrm{H}}{n_\mathrm{H}+n_\mathrm{H_2}}+b_\mathrm{H_2}\frac{n_\mathrm{H_2}}{n_\mathrm{H}+n_\mathrm{H_2}}$$

For $n_\mathrm{H}\approx 1.8 \times 10^7$ molecules cm^{−3}, $n_\mathrm{H_2}\approx 5.2 \times 10^7$ molecules cm^{−3}, $b_\mathrm{H}\approx 2.73 \times 10^{19}$ cm^{−1}⋅s^{−1}, and $b_{H2}\approx 1.46 \times 10^{19}$ cm^{−1}⋅s^{−1}, the binary diffusion parameter is $b_{12}=1.8 \times 10^{19}$. These numbers give $C=2.9\times 10^{13}$molecules cm^{−2}⋅s^{−1}. In more detailed calculations the constant is $C=2.5\times 10^{13}$molecules cm^{−2}⋅s^{−1}. The above formula can be used to calculate the diffusion-limited flux of gases other than hydrogen.

== Diffusion-limited escape in the Solar System ==
Every rocky body in the Solar System with a substantial atmosphere, including Earth, Mars, Venus, and Titan, loses hydrogen at the diffusion-limited rate.

For Mars, the constant governing diffusion-limited escape of hydrogen is $C_\text{Mars}=1.1\times 10^{13}$ molecules cm^{−2}⋅s^{−1}. Spectroscopic measurements of Mars' atmosphere suggest that $f_T(\mathrm{H})=(30\pm 10)\times10^{-6}$. Multiplying these numbers together gives the diffusion-limited rate escape of hydrogen:

$\Phi_l^{mars}=C_\text{Mars}f_T(\mathrm{H})=(3.3\pm1.1)\times 10^8$ H atoms cm^{−2}⋅s^{−1}

Mariner 6 and 7 spacecraft indirectly observed hydrogen escape flux on Mars between $1\times 10^8$and $2\times 10^8$ H atoms cm^{−2}⋅s^{−1}. These observations suggest that Mars' atmosphere is losing hydrogen at roughly the diffusion limited value.

Observations of hydrogen escape on Venus and Titan are also at the diffusion-limit. On Venus, hydrogen escape was measured to be about $1.7\times10^7$ H atoms cm^{−2}⋅s^{−1}, while the calculated diffusion limited rate is about $3\times10^7$H atoms cm^{−2}⋅s^{−1}, which are in reasonable agreement. On Titan, hydrogen escape was measured by the Cassini spacecraft to be $(2.0\pm2.1)\times 10^{10}$ H atoms cm^{−2}⋅s^{−1}, and the calculated diffusion-limited rate is $3\times 10^{10}$H atoms cm^{−2}⋅s^{−1}.

== Applications to Earth's ancient atmosphere ==
=== Oxygen content of the prebiotic atmosphere ===
We can use diffusion-limited hydrogen escape to estimate the amount of O_{2} on the Earth's atmosphere before the rise of life (the prebiotic atmosphere). The O_{2} content of the prebiotic atmosphere was controlled by its sources and sinks. If the potential sinks of O_{2} greatly outweighed the sources, then the atmosphere would have been nearly devoid of O_{2}.

In the prebiotic atmosphere, O_{2} was produced by the photolysis of CO_{2} and H_{2}O in the atmosphere:

$$\ce{CO_2 + h\nu -> CO + O}$$
$$\ce{H_2O + h\nu -> 1/2O_2 + 2H}$$

These reactions aren't necessarily a net source of O_{2}. If the CO and O produced from CO_{2} photolysis remain in the atmosphere, then they will eventually recombine to make CO_{2}. Likewise, if the H and O_{2} from H_{2}O photolysis remain in the atmosphere, then they will eventually react to form H_{2}O. The photolysis of H_{2}O is a net source of O_{2} only if the hydrogen escapes to space.

If we assume that hydrogen escape occurred at the diffusion-limit in the prebiotic atmosphere, then we can estimate the amount of H_{2} that escaped due to water photolysis. If the prebiotic atmosphere had a modern stratospheric H_{2}O mixing ratio of 3 ppmv which is equivalent to 6 ppmv of H after photolysis, then

$\Phi_l(H)=(2.5 \times 10^{13})\cdot(6\times 10^{-6})=1.5\times 10^{8}$H atoms cm^{−2}⋅s^{−1}

Stoichiometry says that every mol of H escape produced 0.25 mol of O_{2} (i.e. $\ce{2H_2O -> O_2 +4H}$), so the abiotic net production of O_{2} from H_{2}O photolysis was $3.75\times 10^7$ O_{2} molecules cm^{−2}⋅s^{−1}. The main sinks of O_{2} would have been reactions with volcanic hydrogen. The modern volcanic H flux is about $7.5 \times 10^{9}$H atoms cm^{−2}⋅s^{−1}. If the prebiotic atmosphere had a similar volcanic hydrogen flux, then the potential O_{2} sink would have been a fourth of the hydrogen volcanism, or $1.9 \times 10^{9}$O_{2} molecules cm^{−2}⋅s^{−1}. These calculated values predict that potential O_{2} sinks were ~50 times greater than the abiotic source. Therefore, O_{2} must have been nearly absent in the prebiotic atmosphere. Photochemical models, which do more complicated versions of the calculations above, predict prebiotic O_{2} mixing ratios below 10^{−11}, which is extremely low compared to the modern O_{2} mixing ratio of 0.21.

=== Hydrogen content of the prebiotic atmosphere ===
H_{2} concentrations in the prebiotic atmosphere were also controlled by its sources and sinks. In the prebiotic atmosphere, the main source of H_{2} was volcanic outgassing, and the main sink of outgassing H_{2} would have been escape to space. Some outgassed H_{2} would have reacted with atmospheric O_{2} to form water, but this was very likely a negligible sink of H_{2} because of scarce O_{2} (see the previous section). This is not the case in the modern atmosphere where the main sink of volcanic H_{2} is its reaction with plentiful atmospheric O_{2} to form H_{2}O.

If we assume that the prebiotic H_{2} concentration was at a steady-state, then the volcanic H_{2} flux was approximately equal to the escape flux of H_{2}.

$$\Phi_\text{volc}(H_2)\approx \Phi_\text{esc}(\mathrm{H_2})$$

Additionally, if we assume that H_{2} was escaping at the diffusion-limited rate as it is on the modern Earth then

$$\Phi_\text{volc}(H_2)\approx \Phi_\text{esc}(H_2)=2.5 \times 10^{13}f_T(\mathrm{H_2})$$

If the volcanic H_{2} flux was the modern value of $3.75 \times 10^{9}$H atoms cm^{−2}⋅s^{−1}, then we can estimate the total hydrogen content of the prebiotic atmosphere.

$f_T(\mathrm{H_2}) \approx \frac{\Phi_{volc}(H_2)}{2.5 \times 10^{13}}=\frac{3.75\times 10^9}{2.5 \times 10^{13}}=1.5\times 10^{-4}=150$ ppmv

By comparison, H_{2} concentration in the modern atmosphere is 0.55 ppmv, so prebiotic H_{2} was likely several hundred times higher than today's value.

This estimate should be considered as a lower bound on the actual prebiotic H_{2} concentration. There are several important factors that we neglected in this calculation. The Earth likely had higher rates of hydrogen outgassing because the interior of the Earth was much warmer ~ 4 billion years ago. Additionally, there is geologic evidence that the mantle was more reducing in the distant past, meaning that even more reduced gases (e.g. H_{2}) would have been outgassed by volcanos relative to oxidized volcanic gases. Other reduced volcanic gases, like CH_{4} and H_{2}S should also contribute to this calculation.
