= Atmospheric escape =

Loss of planetary atmospheric gases to outer space

Atmospheric escape is the loss of planetary atmospheric gases to outer space. A number of different mechanisms can be responsible for atmospheric escape; these processes can be divided into thermal escape, non-thermal (or suprathermal) escape, and impact erosion. The relative importance of each loss process depends on the planet's escape velocity, its atmosphere composition, and its distance from its star. Escape occurs when molecular kinetic energy overcomes gravitational energy; in other words, a molecule can escape when it is moving faster than the escape velocity of its planet. Categorizing the rate of atmospheric escape in exoplanets is necessary to determining whether an atmosphere persists, and so the exoplanet's habitability and likelihood of life.

== Thermal escape mechanisms ==
Thermal escape occurs if the molecular velocity due to thermal energy is sufficiently high. Thermal escape happens at all scales, from the molecular level (Jeans escape) to bulk atmospheric outflow (hydrodynamic escape).

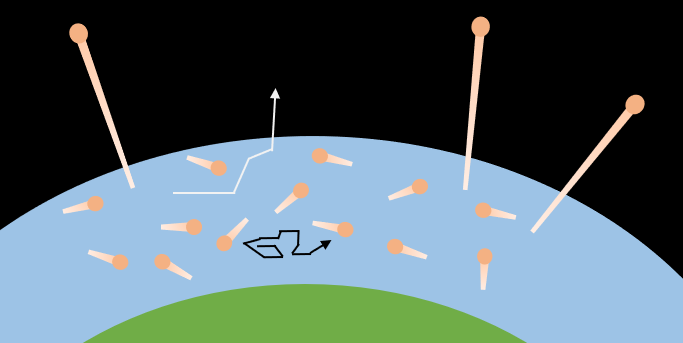
A visualization of Jeans escape. Temperature defines a range of molecular energy. Above the exobase, molecules with enough energy escape, while in the lower atmosphere, molecules are trapped by collisions with other molecules.

=== Jeans escape ===
One classical thermal escape mechanism is Jeans escape, named after British astronomer Sir James Jeans, who first described this process of atmospheric loss. In a quantity of gas, the average velocity of any one molecule is measured by the gas's temperature, but the velocities of individual molecules change as they collide with one another, gaining and losing kinetic energy. The variation in kinetic energy among the molecules is described by the Maxwell distribution. The kinetic energy ($E_{kin}$), mass ($m$), and velocity ($v$) of a molecule are related by $E_{\mathit{kin}}=\frac{1}{2}mv^2$. Individual molecules in the high tail of the distribution (where a few particles have much higher speeds than the average) may reach escape velocity and leave the atmosphere, provided they can escape before undergoing another collision; this happens predominantly in the exosphere, where the mean free path is comparable in length to the pressure scale height. The number of particles able to escape depends on the molecular concentration at the exobase, which is limited by diffusion through the thermosphere.

Three factors strongly contribute to the relative importance of Jeans escape: mass of the molecule, escape velocity of the planet, and heating of the upper atmosphere by radiation from the parent star. Heavier molecules are less likely to escape because they move slower than lighter molecules at the same temperature. This is why hydrogen escapes from an atmosphere more easily than carbon dioxide. Second, a planet with a larger mass tends to have more gravity, so the escape velocity tends to be greater, and fewer particles will gain the energy required to escape. This is why the gas giant planets still retain significant amounts of hydrogen, which escape more readily from Earth's atmosphere. Finally, the distance a planet orbits from a star also plays a part; a close planet has a hotter atmosphere, with higher velocities and hence, a greater likelihood of escape. A distant body has a cooler atmosphere, with lower velocities, and less chance of escape.

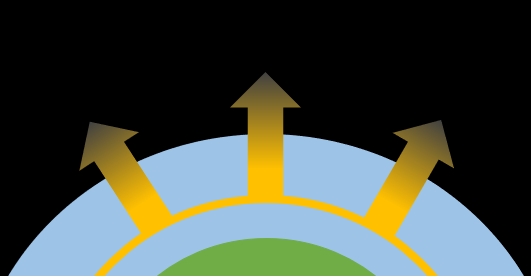
A visualization of hydrodynamic escape. At some level in the atmosphere, the bulk gas will be heated and begin to expand. As the gas expands, it accelerates and escapes the atmosphere. In this process, lighter, faster molecules drag heavier, slower molecules out of the atmosphere.

=== Hydrodynamic escape ===
An atmosphere with high pressure and temperature can also undergo hydrodynamic escape. In this case, a large amount of thermal energy, usually through extreme ultraviolet radiation, is absorbed by the atmosphere. As molecules are heated, they expand upwards and are further accelerated until they reach escape velocity. In this process, lighter molecules can drag heavier molecules with them through collisions as a larger quantity of gas escapes. Hydrodynamic escape has been observed for exoplanets close to their host star, including the hot Jupiter HD 209458 b.

== Non-thermal (suprathermal) escape ==
Escape can also occur due to non-thermal interactions. Most of these processes occur due to photochemistry or charged particle (ion) interactions.

=== Photochemical escape ===
In the upper atmosphere, high energy ultraviolet photons can react more readily with molecules. Photodissociation can break a molecule into smaller components and provide enough energy for those components to escape. Photoionization produces ions, which can get trapped in the planet's magnetosphere or undergo dissociative recombination. In the first case, these ions may undergo escape mechanisms described below. In the second case, the ion recombines with an electron, releases energy, and can escape.

=== Sputtering escape ===
Excess kinetic energy from the solar wind can impart sufficient energy to eject atmospheric particles, similar to sputtering from a solid surface. This type of interaction is more pronounced in the absence of a planetary magnetosphere, as the electrically charged solar wind is deflected by magnetic fields, which mitigates the loss of atmosphere.

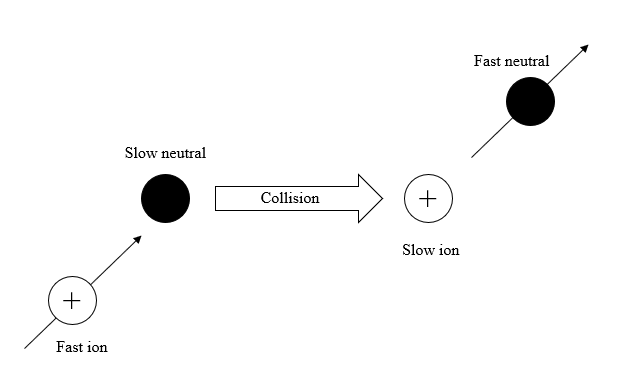
The fast ion captures an electron from a slow neutral in a charge exchange collision. The new, fast neutral can escape the atmosphere, and the new, slow ion is trapped on magnetic field lines.

=== Charge exchange escape ===
Ions in the solar wind or magnetosphere can charge exchange with molecules in the upper atmosphere. A fast-moving ion can capture the electron from a slow atmospheric neutral, creating a fast neutral and a slow ion. The slow ion is trapped on the magnetic field lines, but the fast neutral can escape.

=== Polar wind escape ===
Atmospheric molecules can also escape from the polar regions on a planet with a magnetosphere, due to the polar wind. Near the poles of a magnetosphere, the magnetic field lines are open, allowing a pathway for ions in the atmosphere to exhaust into space. The ambipolar electric field accelerates any ions in the ionosphere, launching along these lines.

== Impact erosion ==
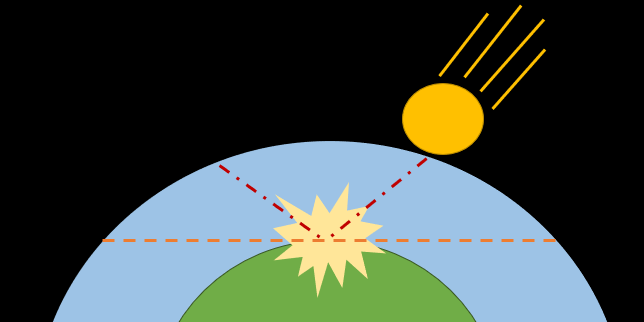
Atmospheric escape from impact erosion is concentrated in a cone (red dash-dotted line) centered at the impact site. The angle of this cone increases with impact energy to eject a maximum of all the atmosphere above a tangent plane (orange dotted line).

The impact of a large meteoroid can lead to the loss of atmosphere. If a collision is sufficiently energetic, it is possible for ejecta, including atmospheric molecules, to reach escape velocity.

In order to have a significant effect on atmospheric escape, the radius of the impacting body must be larger than the scale height. The projectile can impart momentum, and thereby facilitate escape of the atmosphere, in three main ways: (a) the meteoroid heats and accelerates the gas it encounters as it travels through the atmosphere, (b) solid ejecta from the impact crater heat atmospheric particles through drag as they are ejected, and (c) the impact creates vapor which expands away from the surface. In the first case, the heated gas can escape in a manner similar to hydrodynamic escape, albeit on a more localized scale. Most of the escape from impact erosion occurs due to the third case. The maximum atmosphere that can be ejected is above a plane tangent to the impact site.

== Dominant atmospheric escape and loss processes in the Solar System ==
=== Earth ===
Atmospheric escape of hydrogen on Earth is due to charge exchange escape (~60–90%), Jeans escape (~10–40%), and polar wind escape (~10–15%), currently losing about 3 kg/s of hydrogen. The Earth additionally loses approximately 50 g/s of helium primarily through polar wind escape. Escape of other atmospheric constituents is much smaller. A Japanese research team in 2017 found evidence of a small number of oxygen ions on the moon that came from the Earth.

In 1 billion years, the Sun will be 10% brighter, making it hot enough on Earth to dramatically increase the water vapor in the atmosphere where solar ultraviolet light will dissociate H_{2}O, allowing it to gradually escape into space until the oceans dry up.

=== Venus ===
Recent models indicate that hydrogen escape on Venus is almost entirely due to suprathermal mechanisms, primarily photochemical reactions and charge exchange with the solar wind. Oxygen escape is dominated by charge exchange and sputtering escape. Venus Express measured the effect of coronal mass ejections on the rate of atmospheric escape of Venus, and researchers found a factor of 1.9 increase in escape rate during periods of increased coronal mass ejections compared with calmer space weather.

=== Mars ===
Primordial Mars also suffered from the cumulative effects of multiple small impact erosion events, and recent observations with MAVEN suggest that 66% of the ^{36}Ar in the Martian atmosphere has been lost over the last 4 billion years due to suprathermal escape, and the amount of CO_{2} lost over the same time period is around 0.5 bar or more.

The MAVEN mission has also explored the current rate of atmospheric escape of Mars. Jeans escape plays an important role in the continued escape of hydrogen on Mars, contributing to a loss rate that varies between 160–1800 g/s. The Jeans escape of hydrogen can be significantly modulated by lower atmospheric processes, such as gravity waves, convection, and dust storms. Oxygen loss is dominated by suprathermal methods: photochemical (~1300 g/s), charge exchange (~130 g/s), and sputtering (~80 g/s) escape combine for a total loss rate of ~1500 g/s. Other heavy atoms, such as carbon and nitrogen, are primarily lost due to photochemical reactions and interactions with the solar wind.

=== Titan and Io ===
Saturn's moon Titan and Jupiter's moon Io have atmospheres and are subject to atmospheric loss processes. They have no magnetic fields of their own, but orbit planets with powerful magnetic fields, which protects a given moon from the solar wind when its orbit is within the bow shock. However Titan spends roughly half of its orbital period outside of the bow-shock, subjected to unimpeded solar wind. The kinetic energy gained from pick-up and sputtering associated with the solar wind increases thermal escape throughout the orbit of Titan, causing neutral hydrogen to escape. The escaped hydrogen maintains an orbit following in the wake of Titan, creating a neutral hydrogen torus around Saturn. Io, in its orbit around Jupiter, encounters a plasma cloud. Interaction with the plasma cloud induces sputtering, kicking off sodium particles. The interaction produces a stationary banana-shaped charged sodium cloud along a part of the orbit of Io.

== Observations of exoplanet atmospheric escape ==
Studies of exoplanets have measured atmospheric escape as a means of determining atmospheric composition and habitability. The most common method is Lyman-alpha line absorption. Much as exoplanets are discovered using the dimming of a distant star's brightness (transit), looking specifically at wavelengths corresponding to hydrogen absorption describes the amount of hydrogen present in a sphere around the exoplanet. This method indicates that the hot Jupiters HD 209458 b and HD 189733 b and hot Neptune Gliese 436 b are experiencing significant atmospheric escape.

In 2018 it was discovered with the Hubble Space Telescope that atmospheric escape can also be measured with the 1083 nm helium triplet. This wavelength is much more accessible from ground-based high-resolution spectrographs, when compared to the ultraviolet Lyman-alpha lines. The wavelength around the helium triplet has also the advantage that it is not severely affected by interstellar absorption, which is an issue for Lyman-alpha. Helium has on the other hand the disadvantage that it requires knowledge about the hydrogen-helium ratio to model the mass-loss of the atmosphere. Helium escape was measured around many giant exoplanets, including WASP-107b, WASP-69b, and HD 189733 b. It has also been detected around some mini-Neptunes, such as TOI-560 b, TOI-1430b, TOI-1683b, and TOI-2076b.

== Other atmospheric loss mechanisms ==
Sequestration is not a form of escape from the planet, but a loss of molecules from the atmosphere and into the planet. It occurs on Earth when water vapor condenses to form rain or glacial ice, when carbon dioxide is sequestered in sediments or cycled through the oceans or when rocks are oxidized (for example, by increasing the oxidation states of ferric rocks from Fe^{2+} to Fe^{3+}). Gases can also be sequestered by adsorption, where fine particles in the regolith capture gas which adheres to the surface particles.

== See also ==
- Cosmic shoreline
