= Ambipolar diffusion =

Drift between charged and neutral particles in a plasma

Ambipolar diffusion is diffusion of positive and negative particles with opposite electrical charge (such as electrons and positive ions) due to their interaction via an electric field.

== In plasma physics ==
In plasma physics, ambipolar diffusion is related to the concept of quasineutrality. In most plasmas, the forces acting on the ions are different from those acting on the electrons, so naively one would expect one species to be transported faster than the other, whether by diffusion or convection or some other process. If such differential transport has a divergence, then it results in a change of the charge density. The latter will create an electric field that can alter the transport of one or both species in such a way that they become equal.

The simplest example is a plasma localized in an unmagnetized vacuum. (See Inertial confinement fusion.) Both electrons and ions will stream outward with their respective thermal velocity. If the ions are relatively cold, their thermal velocity will be small. The thermal velocity of the electrons will be fast due to their high temperature and low mass: $v_e \approx \sqrt{k_BT_e/m_e}$. As the electrons leave the initial volume, they will leave behind a positive charge density of ions, resulting in an outwardly directed electric field. This field will act on the electrons to slow them down and on the ions to speed them up. The net result is that both ions and electrons stream outward at the speed of sound, $c_s \approx \sqrt{k_BT_e/m_i}$, which is much smaller than the electron thermal velocity, but usually much larger than the ion thermal velocity.

== In astrophysics ==
In astrophysics, "ambipolar diffusion" refers specifically to the decoupling of neutral particles from plasma, for example in the initial stage of star formation. The neutral particles in this case are mostly hydrogen molecules in a cloud that would undergo gravitational collapse if they were not collisionally coupled to the plasma. The plasma is composed of ions (mostly protons) and electrons, which are tied to the interstellar magnetic field and therefore resist collapse. In a molecular cloud where the fractional ionization is very low (one part per million or less), neutral particles only rarely encounter charged particles, and so are not entirely hindered in their collapse (note that now is dynamical collapse, not free fall) into a star.

== In solid state physics ==
In the case of ionic crystals, the fluxes of the diffusing species are also coupled due to the electroneutrality.

== See also ==
- Polar wind
