= Turbopause =

Altitude in the Earth's atmosphere below which turbulent mixing dominates

The turbopause, also called the homopause, marks the altitude in an atmosphere below which turbulent mixing dominates. Mathematically, it is defined as the point where the coefficient of Eddy diffusion is equal to the coefficient of molecular diffusion. Because the molecular diffusion coefficient is dependent on both the composition of the diffusing molecule and the background gas, the turbopause altitude will be different for the different molecular species in an atmosphere. For example, in hydrogen (H_{2}) dominated atmospheres, the helium (He) and methane (CH_{4}) turbopause altitudes are different as a result of the different binary diffusion coefficients of helium and methane in molecular hydrogen.

The region below the turbopause is known as the homosphere, where the atmosphere is well mixed for chemical species which have long mean residence times. Highly reactive chemicals tend to have variable concentration throughout the atmosphere, while unreactive species have more homogeneous concentrations. The region above the turbopause is the heterosphere, where molecular diffusion dominates and the chemical composition of the atmosphere varies according to chemical species and their atomic weight.

Earth's turbopause lies near the mesopause, at the intersection of the mesosphere and the thermosphere, at an altitude of roughly 90 km (56 mi). Some other turbopauses in the Solar System that are known include Venus' turbopause at about 130–135 km (81–84 mi), Mars' at about 130 km (81 mi), Jupiter's at roughly 385 km (239 mi), and Titan's at around 800–850 km (500–530 mi).

It was discovered by French scientists following the firing of two Véronique sounding rockets on 10 and 12 March 1959.
