= Polar wind =

High-altitude atmospheric effect

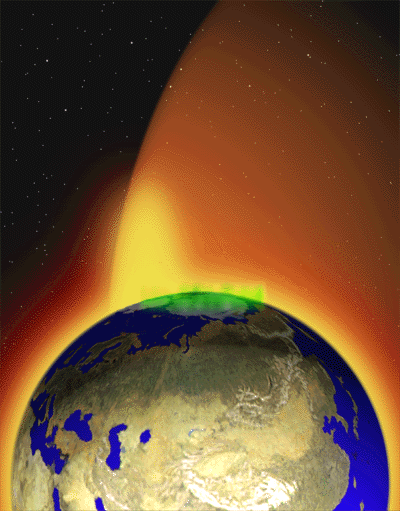
The Earth's plasma fountain, showing oxygen, helium, and hydrogen ions which gush into space from regions near the Earth's poles. The faint yellow area shown above the north pole represents gas lost from Earth into space; the green area is the aurora borealis—or plasma energy pouring back into the atmosphere.

The polar wind or plasma fountain is a permanent outflow of plasma from the polar regions of Earth's magnetosphere. Conceptually similar to the solar wind, it is one of several mechanisms for the outflow of ionized particles. Ions accelerated by a polarization electric field known as an ambipolar electric field is believed to be the primary cause of polar wind. Similar processes operate on other planets.

== History ==
In 1966 Bauer and, separately, Dessler and Michel noted that since the Earth's geomagnetic field above the poles forms a long tail away from the Sun out beyond the Moon's orbit, ions should flow from the higher pressure region in the ionosphere out into space. The term "polar wind" was coined in 1968 in a pair of articles by Banks and Holzer and by Ian Axford. Since the process by which the ionospheric plasma flows away from the Earth along magnetic field lines, is similar to the flow of solar plasma away from the Sun's corona (the solar wind), Axford suggested the term "polar wind."

The earliest experimental characterization of the polar wind came from the 1966 Explorer 33 and especially the 1974 ISIS-2 satellite projects. Additional data from the 1981 Dynamics Explorer led to some uncertainty in the theoretical models about the role of cool O^{+} ions. This issue was cleared up with the more comprehensive data from 1989 Akebono satellite, and the 1996 Polar satellite.

The idea for the polar wind originated with the desire to solve the paradox of the terrestrial helium budget. This paradox consists of the fact that helium in the Earth's atmosphere seems to be produced (via radioactive decay of uranium and thorium) faster than it is lost by escaping from the upper atmosphere. The realization that some helium could be ionized, and therefore escape the Earth along open magnetic field lines near the magnetic poles (the 'polar wind'), is one possible solution to the paradox.

== Causes ==
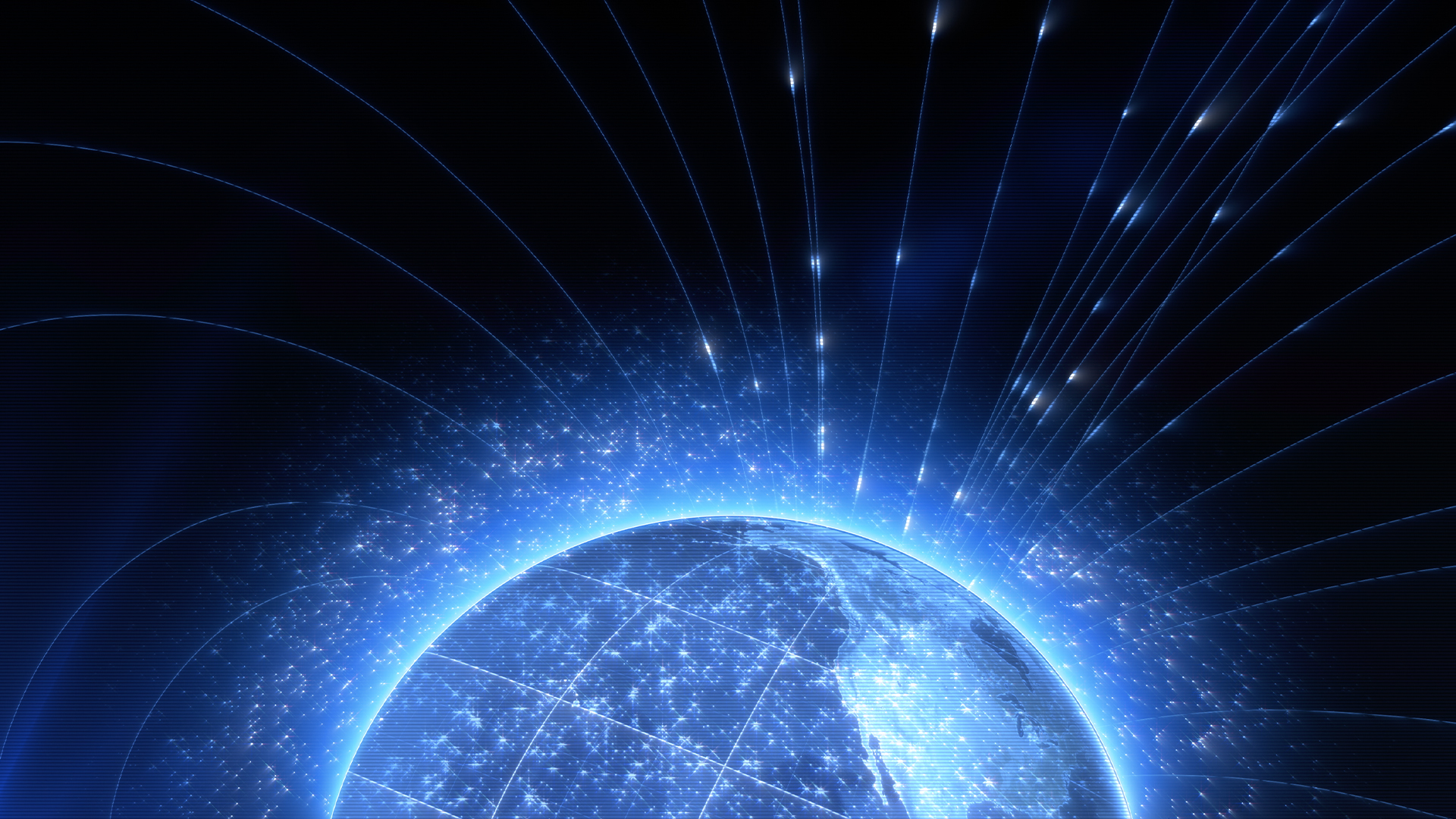
Conceptual diagram of the two main effects of the ambipolar electric field: inflating the ionosphere and generating the polar wind.The sparkling blue haze surrounding Earth represents the plasma in the ionosphere. The sparkling lines represent polar wind flowing up and out.

After 30 years of research, part of the cause of the polar wind has been shown to be ambipolar outflow of thermal plasma: ion acceleration by a polarization electric field in the ionosphere. The polarization or ambipolar electric field was originally proposed in the 1920s for ionized stellar atmospheres. Gravitational charge separation creates a field amounting to
$$E = -\mu \cdot \vec{g} / e$$
where $\vec{g}$ is the gravitational field and $\mu$ is the mean ionic mass, half the difference between the mass of the singly charged ions and the electron. This simple formula is only applicable in a plasma in hydrostatic equilibrium. More complex models applicable to real plasmas show larger field strength. In any case the field is very small but, unlike other forces, it points away from gravity. In low density plasma at high altitude it overwhelms gravity for light ions.

In the region of the polar wind, the ionospheric plasma expands and the low density allows gravity to pull ions down relative to the electrons in the plasma. The charge separation results in the electric field which then sends some of the ions up and out of the atmosphere. This mechanism is known as "ambipolar outflow" and the field as "ambipolar electric field" or "polarization electric field". Additional mechanisms include ion acceleration by solar photoelectrons escaping along magnetic field lines.

The outflow of ions due to the ambipolar electric field end up accumulating in the plasmasphere if they follow closed magnetic field lines but ions following open magnetic field lines exit the Earth system. Ions following open magnetic field lines are push away from the Sun by forces of the solar wind (anti-solar convection).

== Measurements ==
Numerous investigations of the polar wind have launched, including ISIS-2, Dynamics Explorer, the Akebono satellite, and the Polar satellite, covering a variety of altitudes, latitudes, and times relative to the solar cycle. Some of the conclusions include:

- the primary ingredients in the polar wind are electrons, hydrogen (H^{+}), helium (He^{+}), and oxygen (O^{+}) ions,
- O^{+} ions dominate at below 4000 km,
- all three ion species reach supersonic velocities above 7000 km and velocities increase to over Mach number 2 above 50,000 km.
- polar wind velocity increases with altitude, and is higher on the dayside of the Earth,

The polarization or ambipolar electric field was directly measured in 2022 by a sounding rocket launched from Svalbard. This NASA mission was called Endurance. Comparing the electrical potential at altitude of 250 km to that at 768 km gave a difference of +0.55 volt with an uncertainty of 0.09 volt.

== See also ==
- Ambipolar diffusion
