= Homosphere =

Layer of an atmosphere where the bulk gases are homogeneously mixed

The homosphere is the layer of an atmosphere where the bulk gases are homogeneously mixed due to turbulent mixing or eddy diffusion. The bulk composition of the air is mostly uniform so the concentrations of molecules are the same throughout the homosphere. The top of the homosphere is called the homopause, also known as the turbopause. Above the homopause is the heterosphere, where diffusion is faster than mixing, and heavy gases decrease in density with altitude more rapidly than lighter gases.

Some of the processes driving this uniformity include heating convection and air flow patterns. In the troposphere, rising warm air replaces higher cooler air which mix gases vertically. Wind patterns push air across the surface mixing it horizontally. At higher altitudes, other atmospheric circulation regimes exist, such as the Brewer-Dobson circulation in the terrestrial stratosphere, which mixes the air. In Earth's mesophere, atmospheric waves become unstable and dissipate, creating turbulent mixing of this region.

== Earth's homosphere ==
A graph showing the seven largest component gases of the Earth's atmosphere. Relative concentrations maintain the same ratios from 0 to around 90 km (56 mi), represented by relatively horizontal lines. The crossing curves of the rightmost nine-tenths of the graph show how these ratios vary considerably at higher altitudes.

The Earth's homosphere starts at the Earth's surface and extends to the turbopause at about 90 km (56 mi). It incorporates all of the troposphere, stratosphere, mesosphere, and the lower part of the thermosphere. Chemically the homosphere is composed of 78% nitrogen, 21% oxygen, and trace amounts of other molecules, such as argon and carbon dioxide. It contains over 99% of the mass of the Earth's atmosphere. The density of air decreases with height in the homosphere. By definition & notably, it also includes a 10 km (6.2 mi) thick band of elemental mesosphere sodium.

=== Variations in concentration ===
One large-scale exception to effective mixing is the ozone layer, centered at about 20–30 km (12–19 mi) in altitude, where the concentration of O_{3} is much higher than in the rest of the atmosphere. This is due to incoming ultraviolet light, which turns O_{2} into O_{3}. This created ozone itself blocks most ultraviolet light from penetrating to lower layers of the atmosphere and creating similar levels of ozone there. With a half-life of about a day at room temperature, ozone breaks down before it can mix completely with the lower levels of the atmosphere. The ozone hole is a relatively stable structure caused by a combination of pollution and antarctic wind patterns in the stratosphere.

Water vapor concentration (humidity) varies considerably, especially in the troposphere, and is a major component of weather. Water evaporation is driven by heat from incoming solar radiation, and temperature variations can cause water-saturated air to expunge water in the form of rain, snow, or fog. The heat gained and lost by water through these processes increases turbulence in the lower atmosphere, especially at mesoscale and microscale. The Brewer–Dobson circulation is a theory of large-scale ozone circulation.

Concentrations of other trace gases are higher near natural and artificial sources. This includes pollution from human activity (especially agriculture, industry, and transportation), natural gas fields, radon produced by radioactive decay in certain minerals, volcanic gas, emissions from limnic eruptions. Oxygen is emitted and carbon dioxide is absorbed by plants and microorganisms performing photosynthesis, but CO_{2} levels are most strongly affected by wild fires and human activity.
