= Heterosphere =

Upper atmospheric region where molecular diffusion dominates

The heterosphere is the layer of an atmosphere where gases are separated out by molecular diffusion with increasing altitude such that lighter species become more abundant relative to heavier species. The heavier molecules and atoms tend to be present in the lower layers of the heterosphere while the lighter ones are present higher up. The exact boundaries between the different molecules vary according to temperature and solar activity. The heterosphere extends from the turbopause to the edge of a planet's atmosphere and lies directly above the homosphere.

== Earth's heterosphere ==
The volume fraction of the main gases in Earth's atmosphere according to height. The heterosphere is above about 90 km in the graph.

The heterosphere of Earth begins at an altitude of about 90 km (56 mi) and extends to the outer reaches of its atmosphere. It incorporates most of the thermosphere and all of the exosphere. The major constituents of Earth's heterosphere are nitrogen, oxygen, helium, and hydrogen. Nitrogen and oxygen compose the lower portion of the heterosphere. In the higher levels of the heterosphere, above about 1,000 km (621 mi) helium and hydrogen are the dominant species present. The heterosphere also incorporates the ionosphere with ions present in the heterosphere's lower levels. These include O^{+}, NO^{+}, O_{2}^{+}, and N_{2}^{+}. Due to the diffused nature of the heterosphere's gases, its density at any given height is not entirely dependent on the temperature. Other factors contributing to density variations in the heterosphere include day and night cycles, solar activity, geomagnetic activity, and seasonal cycles. The heterosphere contains less than 0.001% of the Earth's atmosphere's total mass.
