= Geology of Bulgaria =

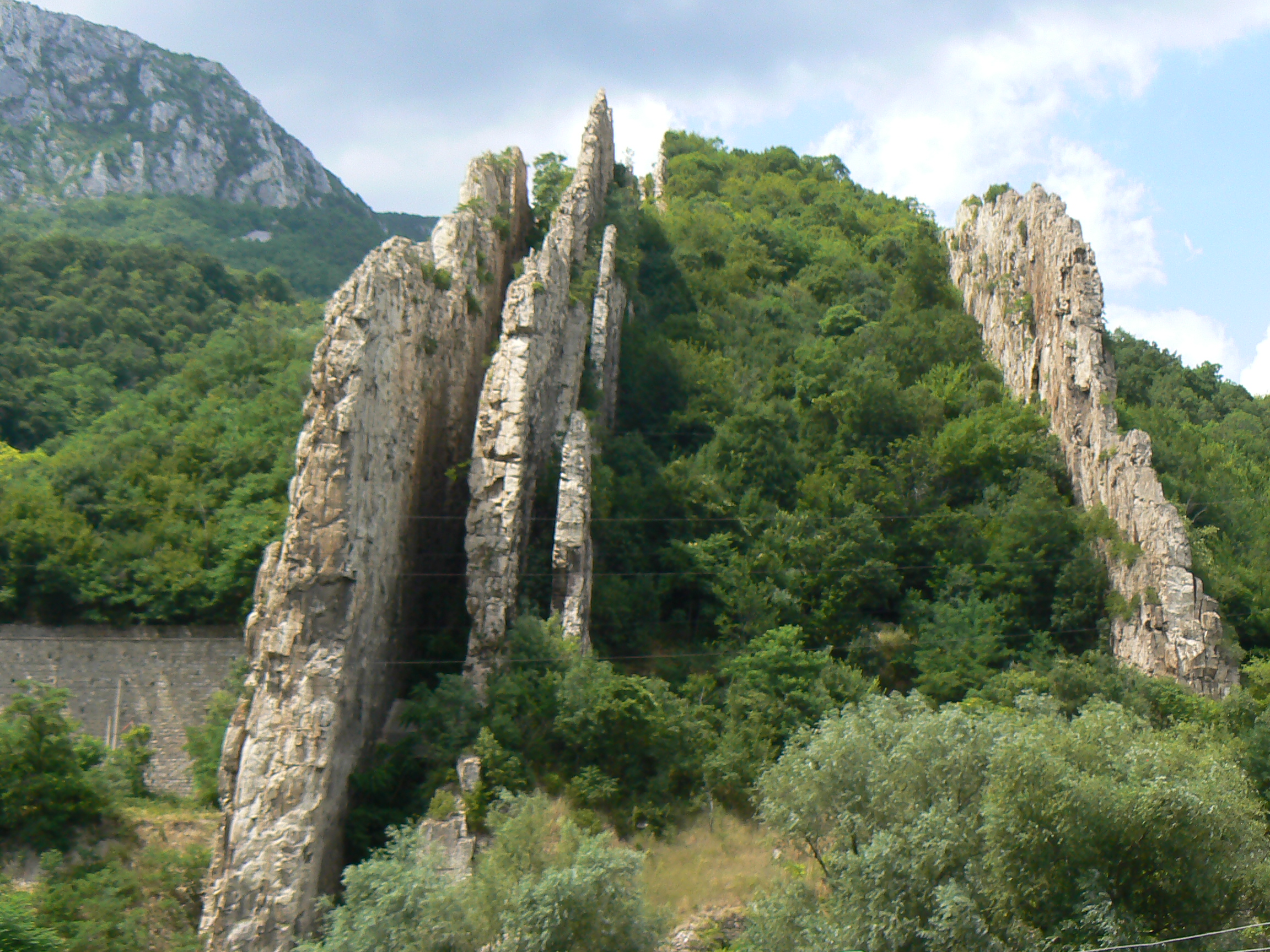
Vertically-tilted layers of Lower Cretaceous limestone of the Ritlite natural landmark in Lyutibrod

The geology of Bulgaria consists of two major structural features. The Rhodope Massif in southern Bulgaria is made up of Archean, Proterozoic and Cambrian rocks and is a sub-province of the Thracian-Anatolian polymetallic province. It has dropped down, faulted basins filled with Cenozoic sediments and volcanic rocks. The Moesian Platform to the north extends into Romania and has Paleozoic rocks covered by rocks from the Mesozoic, typically buried by thick Danube River valley Quaternary sediments. In places, the Moesian Platform has small oil and gas fields. Bulgaria is a country in southeastern Europe. It is bordered by Romania to the north, Serbia and North Macedonia to the west, Greece and Turkey to the south, and the Black Sea to the east.

== Geologic history and stratigraphy ==
=== Precambrian (before 538.8 million years ago) ===
Archean rocks outcrop in the south and west of Bulgaria as part of an ultrametamorphosed polymetamorphic complex including low-grade migmatite, gneissoid granite, and anatexite. Marble, amphibolite and gneiss from the Proterozoic are found in the Rhodope Massif.

During the Precambrian, the Variscan Thracian Suture was part of the Balkan-Carpathian ophiolite segment. This feature left behind a highly stratified obducted ophiolite island arc assemblage with tectonized peridotite, dunite, lherzolite, wehrlite and troctolite, as well as pillow lava meta-basalt, and sheeted dikes of micro-gabbro and dolerite. Outcropping in the northwest, these rocks were originally part of the suture north a large landmass and south of the Moesian Platform rocks.

=== Paleozoic (538.8–251.9 million years ago) ===
At the outset of the Paleozoic, Cambrian age pelitic sediments formed together with volcanic rocks such as keratophyre, spilite, and pyroclastic flows, associated with tholeiitic island arc volcanism. Ordovician, Silurian and Middle Devonian shale and lydite (a form of siliceous argillite rich in graptolite fossils) outcrops in the west.

The Caledonian orogeny affected the region in the Middle Devonian through the Carboniferous. Carbonates deposited, along with a basin filled with turbidites between two landmasses. Lakes were common during the late Paleozoic, depositing anthracite coal now found north of Varna and Sofia. Permian rocks reflect terrestrial sedimentation and dry land conditions and contain some coal as well as thick conglomerate layers.

=== Mesozoic (251.9–66 million years ago) ===
In the Triassic, the lithospheric plates of the Moesian Platform in the north and the Rhodope Massif in the south continued to interact. At the beginning of the Mesozoic, red sandstones were depositing in terrestrial conditions, but as time passed the region became submerged during a marine transgression, kicking off carbonate deposition. During the Ladinian, the central part of the basin reached greater depths below water and experienced anoxic conditions, leading to the formation of organic-rich black shale. The late Triassic brought a marine regression, reducing water levels and returning to platform carbonate formation and then by the Norian carbonate breccia formed as dry land conditions prevailed. In the northwest, there are some signs of volcanism from the time, including continental rift trachyandesite and andesite-basalt eruptions.

In the east, particularly within the East Balkan Range, are olistolith remnants as an allochthon of Triassic rocks in Middle Jurassic black shales. Triassic rocks include turbidite sandstone and sub-reefal limestone. In Srednogorie, they form a sizeable nappe with phyllite, amphibolite, calcareous schist and turbidites as well as marble.

During the Jurassic, a marine transgression began, flooding the entire region by the Callovian. Early Jurassic rocks include basal sandstone and limestone, rich in ammonite, bivalve and brachiopod fossils. A deepwater basin, likely branched off the Paleotethys Ocean was discovered in the East Balkan Range. It was bordered to the south by a turbidite basin with red marl and limestone.

The center of the basin witnessed black shale deposition in the Middle Jurassic while the edges deposited biomicritic limestone. The northwest and northeast formed platform limestones, separated by a "groove" of pelagic micrite and nodular limestone. This sedimentation pattern continued into the Cretaceous, until the Barremian when reef limestones and marl began to build up. An orogeny began in Austria at the end of the Albian, reducing sea levels and confining marine environments to the northwest. By the late Cretaceous, epicontinental limestones were depositing on the Moesian Platform in the north. An island arc developed in the south, while the South Carpathians trough appeared in the northwest, filling with turbidite and marl. Intensive igneous activity began due to subduction in the area of Srednogorie. Deepwater sedimentation with pelagic limestone and turbidites, together with volcanic rocks such as tholeiitic, calc-alkaline or shoshonite rocks mark the late Cretaceous. In fact, rocks near Srednogorie often contain copper ores. The events of the late Cretaceous were the first signs globally of the formation of the Alpine-Himalayan mountain belt.
