= Fidalgo ophiolite =

Geology of the Fidalgo ophiolite complex in Washington

Fidalgo Complex
- Stratigraphic range: Jurassic
- Type: primarily igneous, but also volcanic and sedimentary; variably metamorphosed at low grade
- Unit of: Northwest Cascades Thrust System; Haystack nappe
- Overlies: Easton nappe

Lithology
- Primary: peridotite (incl. serpentinite), gabbro, diorite, plagiogranite, keratophyre, spilite
- Other: greywacke, argillite, chert

Location
- Region: San Juan Islands, northwest Washington
- Country: United States

Type section
- Named for: Fidalgo Island, Washington
- Named by: Edwin (Ned) Brown.

The Fidalgo ophiolite or Fidalgo complex is a Jurassic-aged ophiolite sequence located in the San Juan Islands of northwest Washington. The ophiolite complex is a metamorphosed and disrupted ophiolite sequence that contains serpentinized peridotite, layered gabbro, diorite, and plagiogranite, and an overlying sequence of volcanic and sedimentary rocks.

== Geologic history ==
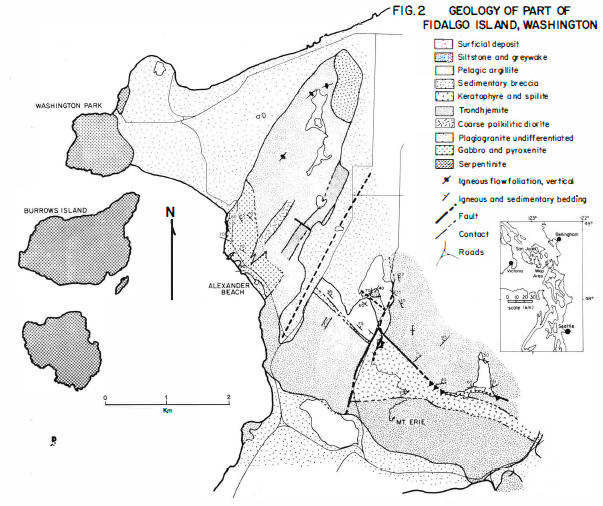
Geologic map of the Fidalgo ophiolite on Fidalgo island by Ned Brown, courtesy of Oregon Department of Geology and Mineral Industries.

The Fidalgo ophiolite is one of several Jurassic ophiolite complexes that occur along the western margin of North America, such as the Coast Range ophiolite. The Fidalgo ophiolite occurs within the Haystack nappe of the Northwest Cascades thrust system and structurally overlies the Easton nappe. The Fidalgo is interpreted to have formed in an island arc setting during the Middle to Late Jurassic based on the chemistry of igneous rocks within the complex and K-Ar and U-Pb ages of plagiogranite and gabbro

== Description ==
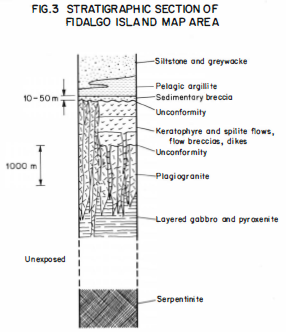
Stratigraphic section of the Fidalgo ophiolite by Ned Brown, courtesy of Oregon Department of Geology and Mineral Industries.

The Fidalgo ophiolite can be broadly divided into an ultramafic section, mafic to intermediate intrusive rocks, and a volcanic and sedimentary cover sequence. The ultramafic section is best exposed in Washington Park, west of Anacortes, Washington, and consists of serpentinized harzburgite and dunite with crosscutting veins of pyroxenite. Intrusive rocks of the Fidalgo ophiolite are exposed in the Anacortes Community Forest Lands, along Marine Dr and Anaco Beach Rd., and at Mt. Erie. Within the intrusive suite, layered gabbro and pyroxenite occur structurally above the ultramafic section and are cut by dikes that vary in composition from hornblende gabbro to diorite and plagiogranite. The sedimentary sequence consists of volcanic keratophyre and spilite interbedded with greywacke and argillite. Fossil radiolaria in the argillite constrain the age of the sediment to Kimmeridgian through Early Tithonian
