= Mesoarchean =

Third era of the Archean Eon

- 3200 – 2800 Ma
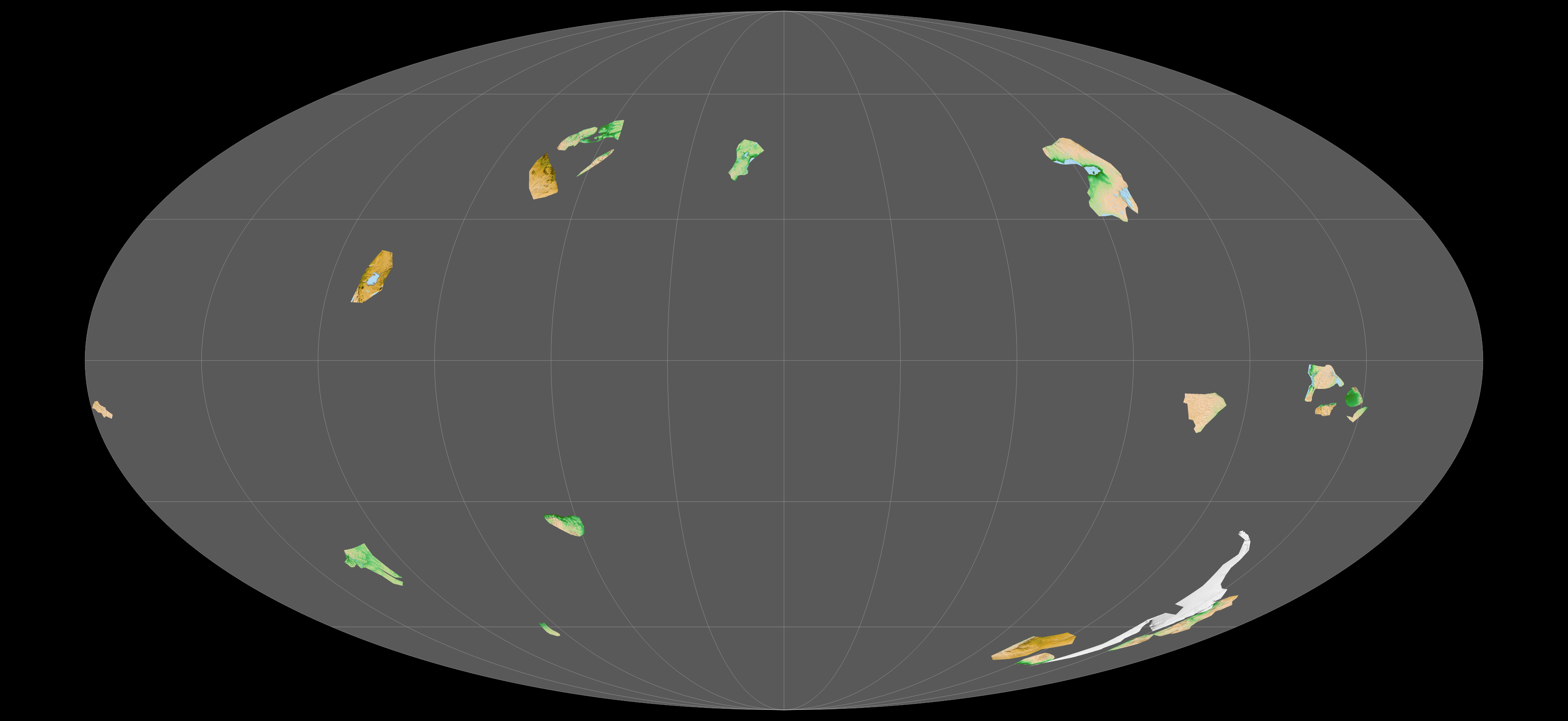
- A reconstruction of the Earth's continents during the middle Mesoarchean, c. 3 Ga.

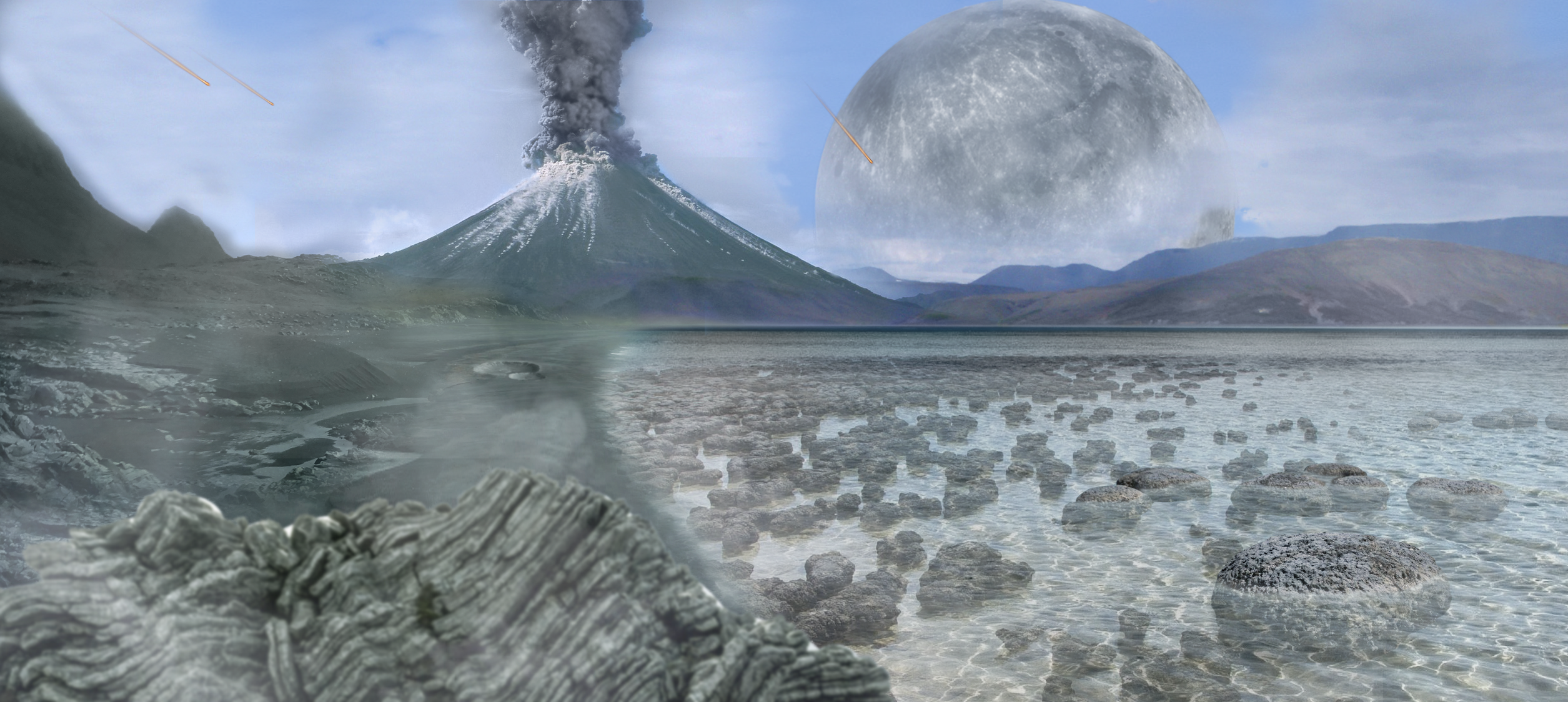
- Artist impression of the Archean eon

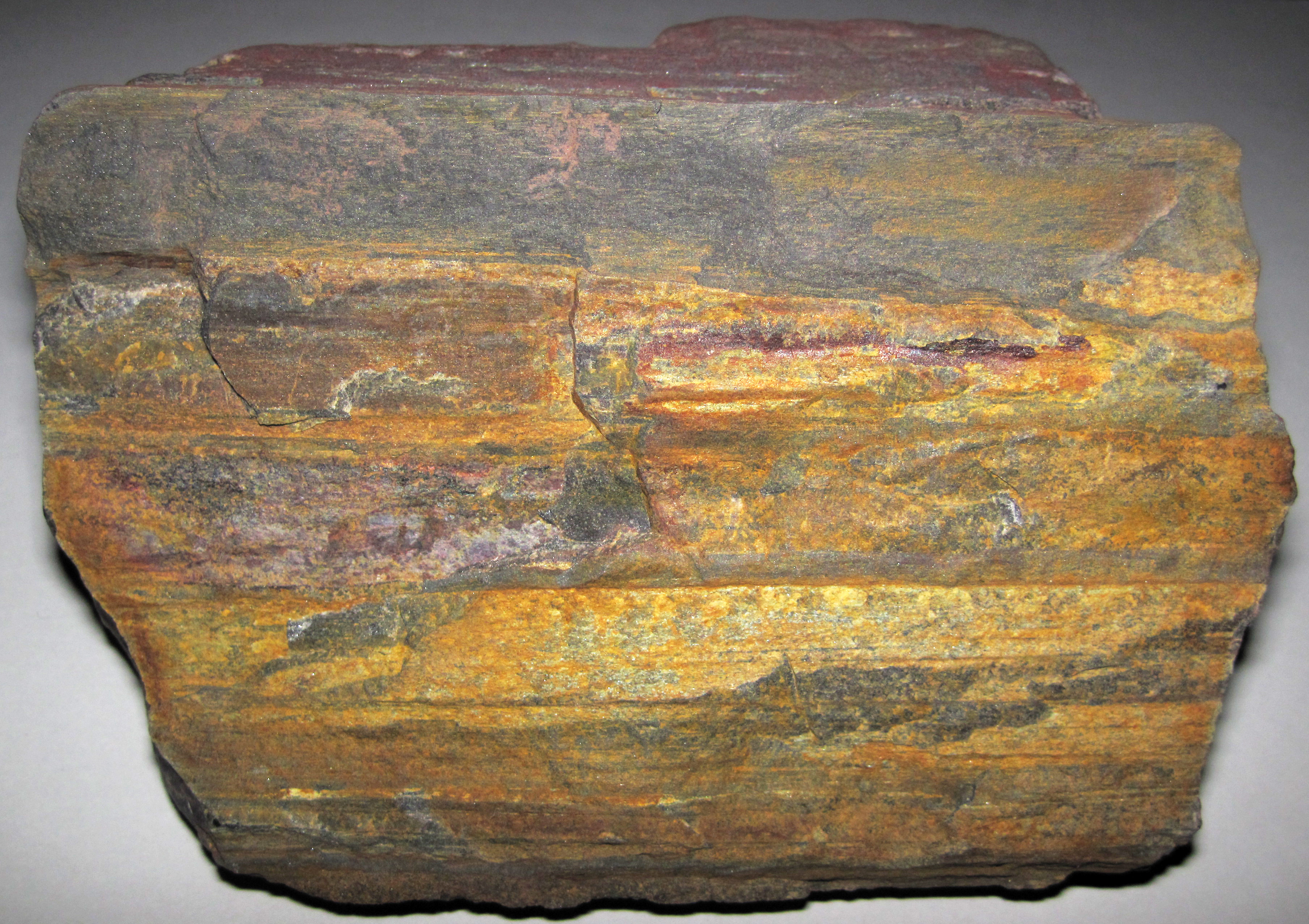
- Banded iron formation created during the Mesoarchean era

Chronology
| ← / Pongola glaciation |
Major glacial period
Events of the Mesoarchean Era; Vertical axis scale: Millions of years ago
- Proposed redefinition(s): 3490–2780 Ma; Gradstein et al., 2012
- Proposed subdivisions: Vaalbaran Period, 3490–3020 Ma Gradstein et al., 2012; Pongolan Period, 3020–2780 Ma Gradstein et al., 2012

Etymology
- Name formality: Formal
- Alternate spelling(s): Mesoarchaean

Usage information
- Celestial body: Earth
- Regional usage: Global (ICS)
- Time scale(s) used: ICS Time Scale

Definition
- Chronological unit: Era
- Stratigraphic unit: Erathem
- Time span formality: Formal
- Lower boundary definition: Defined Chronometrically
- Lower GSSA ratified: Not formally defined
- Upper boundary definition: Defined Chronometrically
- Upper GSSA ratified: Not formally defined

The Mesoarchean (/ˌmiːzoʊ.ɑːrˈkiːən, ˌmɛzoʊ-/ MEE-zoh-ar-KEE-ən, MEZ-oh-, also spelled Mesoarchaean) is a geologic era in the Archean Eon, spanning 3,200 to 2,800 million years ago, which contains the first evidence of modern-style plate subduction and expansion of microbial life. The era is defined chronometrically and is not referenced to a specific level in a rock section on Earth.

== Tectonics ==
The Mesoarchean era is thought to be the birthplace of modern-style plate subduction, based on geologic evidence from the Pilbara Craton in western Australia. A convergent margin with a modern-style oceanic arc existed at the boundary between West and East Pilbara approximately 3.12 Ga. By 2.97 Ga, the West Pilbara Terrane converged with and accreted onto the East Pilbara Terrane. A supercontinent, Vaalbara, may have existed in the Mesoarchean.

== Environmental conditions ==
Analysis of oxygen isotopes in Mesoarchean cherts has been helpful in reconstructing Mesoarchean surface temperatures. These cherts led researchers to draw an estimate of an oceanic temperature around 55-85°C (131-185 Fahrenheit), while other studies of weathering rates postulate average temperatures below 50°C (122 Fahrenheit).

The Mesoarchean atmosphere contained high levels of atmospheric methane and carbon dioxide, which could be an explanation for the high temperatures during this era. Atmospheric dinitrogen content in the Mesoarchean is thought to have been similar to today, suggesting that nitrogen did not play an integral role in the thermal budget of ancient Earth.

The Pongola glaciation occurred around 2.9 Ga, from which there is evidence of ice extending to a palaeolatitude (latitude based on the magnetic field recorded in the rock) of 48 degrees. This glaciation was likely not triggered by the evolution of photosynthetic cyanobacteria, which likely occurred in the interval between the Huronian glaciations and the Makganyene glaciation.

== Early microbial life ==
Microbial life with diverse metabolisms expanded during the Mesoarchean era and produced gases that influenced early Earth's atmospheric composition. Cyanobacteria produced oxygen gas, but oxygen did not begin to accumulate in the atmosphere until later in the Archean. Small oases of relatively oxygenated water did exist in some nearshore shallow marine environments by this era, however.

== See also ==
- Geologic time scale – System that relates geologic strata to time
- Glacial period – Geological era
- Ice age – Period of long-term reduction in temperature of Earth's surface and atmosphere
- Last glacial period – Period of major glaciations of the Northern Hemisphere (115,000–11,700 years ago)
