= Witwatersrand =

Ridge of erosion-resistant rock in South Africa

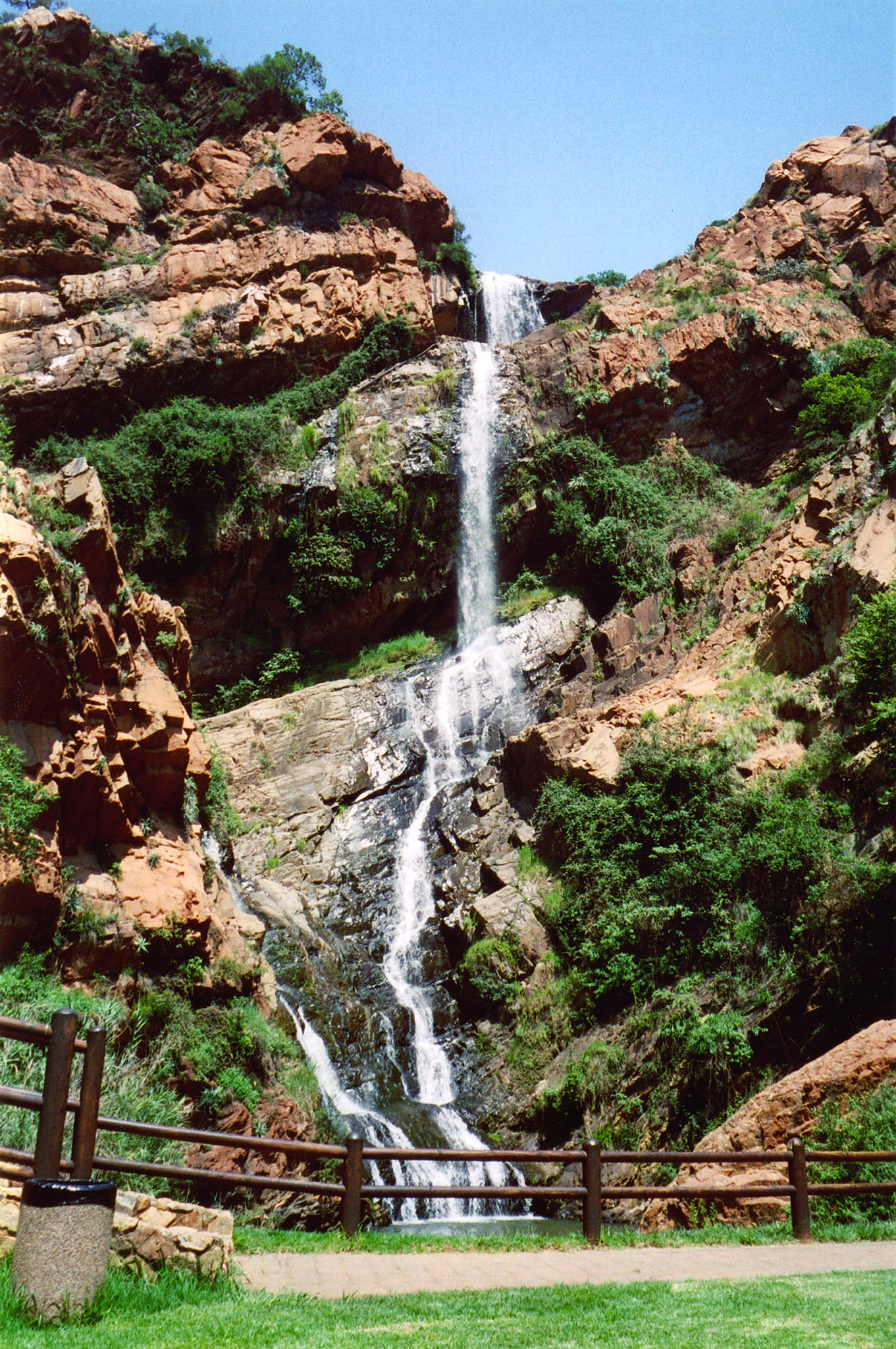
- Witpoortjie Falls in the Walter Sisulu National Botanical Garden, formerly the Witwatersrand National Botanical Gardens. Waterfalls like this, cascading over a 56-kilometre-long (35 mi) quartzite ridge in Gauteng gave rise to the name "Witwatersrand", which means "white water ridge" in Afrikaans.

Highest point
- Elevation: 1,913 m (6,276 ft)
- Coordinates: 26°12′13″S 28°2′34″E

Dimensions
- Length: 56 km (35 mi) ESE/WNW
- Width: 10 km (6.2 mi) NNE/SSW

Geography
- Location within South Africa
- Country: South Africa
- Provinces: North West; Gauteng; Mpumalanga

Geology
- Orogeny: Vredefort impact structure
- Rock age: Archean
- Rock types: Quartzites; conglomerates; banded ironstones; tillites; shales

Climbing
- Easiest route: From Gauteng or Pretoria

The Witwatersrand (UK: /wɪtˈwɔːtərzrænd, -rɑːnd/, US also /ˈwɪtwɔːtərz-/; Afrikaans pronunciation: [ˌvətˌvɑːtərsˈrant]; locally the Rand or, less commonly, the Reef) is a 56-kilometre-long (35 mi), north-facing scarp in South Africa. It consists of a hard, erosion-resistant quartzite metamorphic rock, over which several north-flowing rivers form waterfalls, which account for the name Witwatersrand, meaning 'white water ridge' in Afrikaans. This east-west-running scarp can be traced with only one short gap, from Bedfordview (about 10 km [6.2 mi] west of O.R. Tambo International Airport) in the east, through Johannesburg and Roodepoort, to Krugersdorp in the west (see the diagram at left below).

The scarp forms the northern edge of a 7-to-10-kilometre-wide (4–6 mi) plateau (or ridge) which rises about 200 m (660 ft) above the surrounding plains of the Highveld. A number of picturesque Johannesburg suburbs, including Observatory, Linksfield Ridge and Upper Houghton are located along the scarp, overlooking the rest of northern Johannesburg with views up to the Magaliesberg (although locals refer to segments of the scarp using area-specific names, such as Linksfield Ridge, Parktown Ridge or Observatory Ridge). The entire plateau-like structure is also often called the Witwatersrand. The plateau's elevation above sea-level is between 1,700 and 1,800 metres (5,600–5,900 ft).

The Witwatersrand plateau forms a continental divide, with the run-off to the north draining into the Indian Ocean via the Crocodile and Limpopo rivers, while the run-off to the south drains via the Vaal into the Orange River and ultimately into the Atlantic Ocean.

Because of the extraordinary quantities of gold that have been extracted from the Witwatersrand rocks, the South African currency was named the rand in 1961 upon the declaration of the republic.

Witwatersrand and the Rand are names for the conurbation that developed along the range, although the terms are falling into disuse and Witwatersrand was the "W" in PWV (Pretoria-Witwatersrand-Vereeniging), the initial name of Gauteng province. In this context, it has lent its name to institutions including the University of the Witwatersrand (Wits University) and the defunct Rand Afrikaans University (RAU, now part of the University of Johannesburg), and to towns and regions such as the East Rand, West Rand and Randburg.

== Geology ==
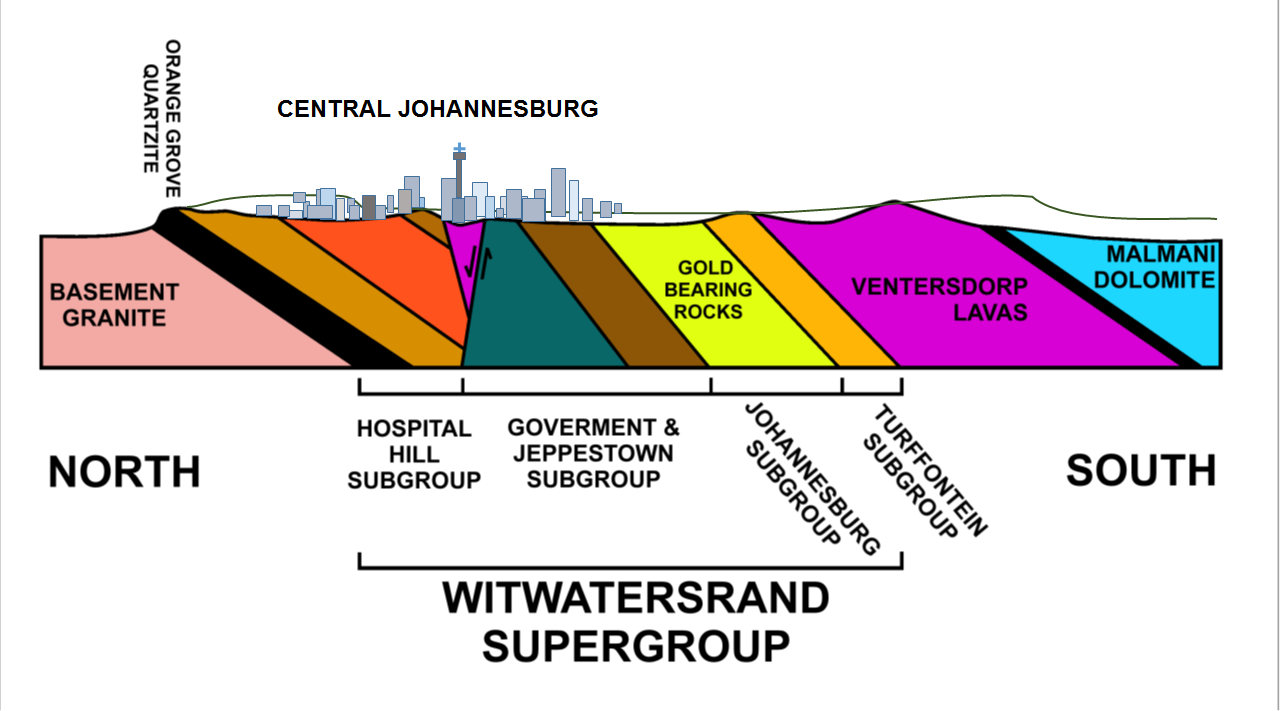
A diagrammatic north–south cross section through the Witwatersrand ridge / plateau, below the Johannesburg city center. Only the major subgroups of rocks are shown, each of which is made up of many separate layers of varying composition. The harder layers form the hills, and the softer layers the valleys. The oldest rocks of the Witwatersrand Supergroup form the Orange Grove Quartzite layer. This forms the scarp in the north, from which the Witwatersrand derives its name. The granite to the north of the Orange Grove Quartzite scarp is around 3.2 billion years old, and is an exposed portion of the underlying Kaapvaal craton on which a large portion of South Africa rests. (See illustration below.) To place this diagram into its broader context, see the diagrammatic geological cross section through the Vredefort impact structure at the end of the article.

The Witwatersrand plateau consists of a 5000-to-7000-metre-thick (3.1–4.3 mi) layer of mainly sedimentary rocks laid down over a period of about 260 million years, starting approximately 2.97 billion years ago. The entire series of rocks, known as the "Witwatersrand Supergroup", consists of very hard erosion resistant quartzites, banded ironstones and some marine lava deposits, interspersed with softer, more easily eroded tillites, mudstones and conglomerates. The oldest rocks (laid down 2.97 billion years ago) form the northern scarp of the Witwatersrand plateau; the youngest (laid down 2.71 billion years ago) are those that form the southern edge of the plateau.

Gold is found in the conglomerate strata of the younger members of the Supergroup, locally referred to as banket. The abundance of this gold is without a natural equal anywhere else in the world. Over 40,000 tonnes (44,000 short tons) have been mined from these rocks since this precious metal was first discovered here in 1886. This accounts for approximately 22% of all the gold that is accounted for today.

Not all the conglomerates contain gold, and of those that do (known as "reefs" by the miners), the gold is not uniformly distributed throughout the layer, but tends to occur in streaks, where the pebbles that make up the conglomerate are larger than elsewhere. Here the gold is associated with other minerals, especially iron pyrite and uraninite, as well as carbon rich materials such as kerogen, or bitumen, which occurs in small balls less than 1 mm (0.04 in) in size, called "flyspeck carbon", or as continuous layers about 10–20 mm (0.4–0.8 in) thick. The gold-bearing conglomerates occur chiefly in the upper, younger layers of the Witwatersrand Supergroup of rocks, on the southern side of the Witwatersrand plateau.

The Witwatersrand Supergroup strata which reach the surface in Johannesburg dip downwards to the south at an angle of about 30°. From there on they are almost everywhere, with very few exceptions (see below), covered by younger rocks. Gold mining in these buried portions of the Witwatersrand Supergroup is sometimes carried out at depths of 4 kilometres (2.5 mi) below the surface.

=== Witwatersrand Basin ===
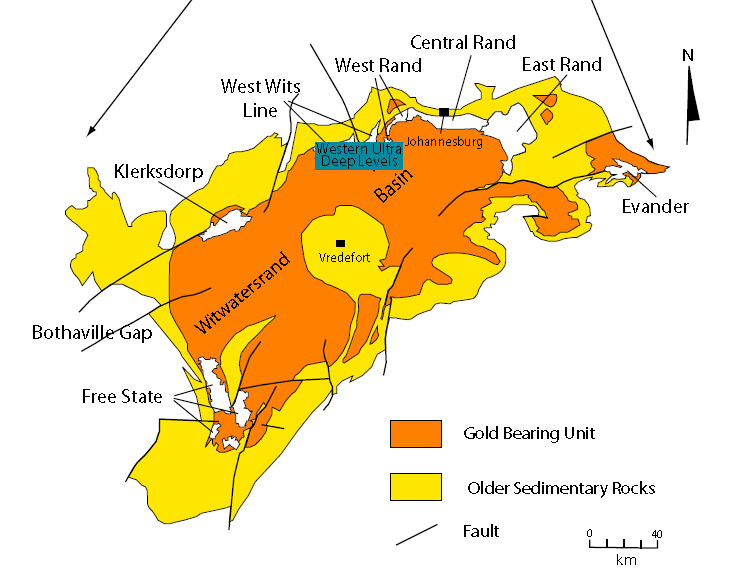
Witwatersrand Basin and major goldfields

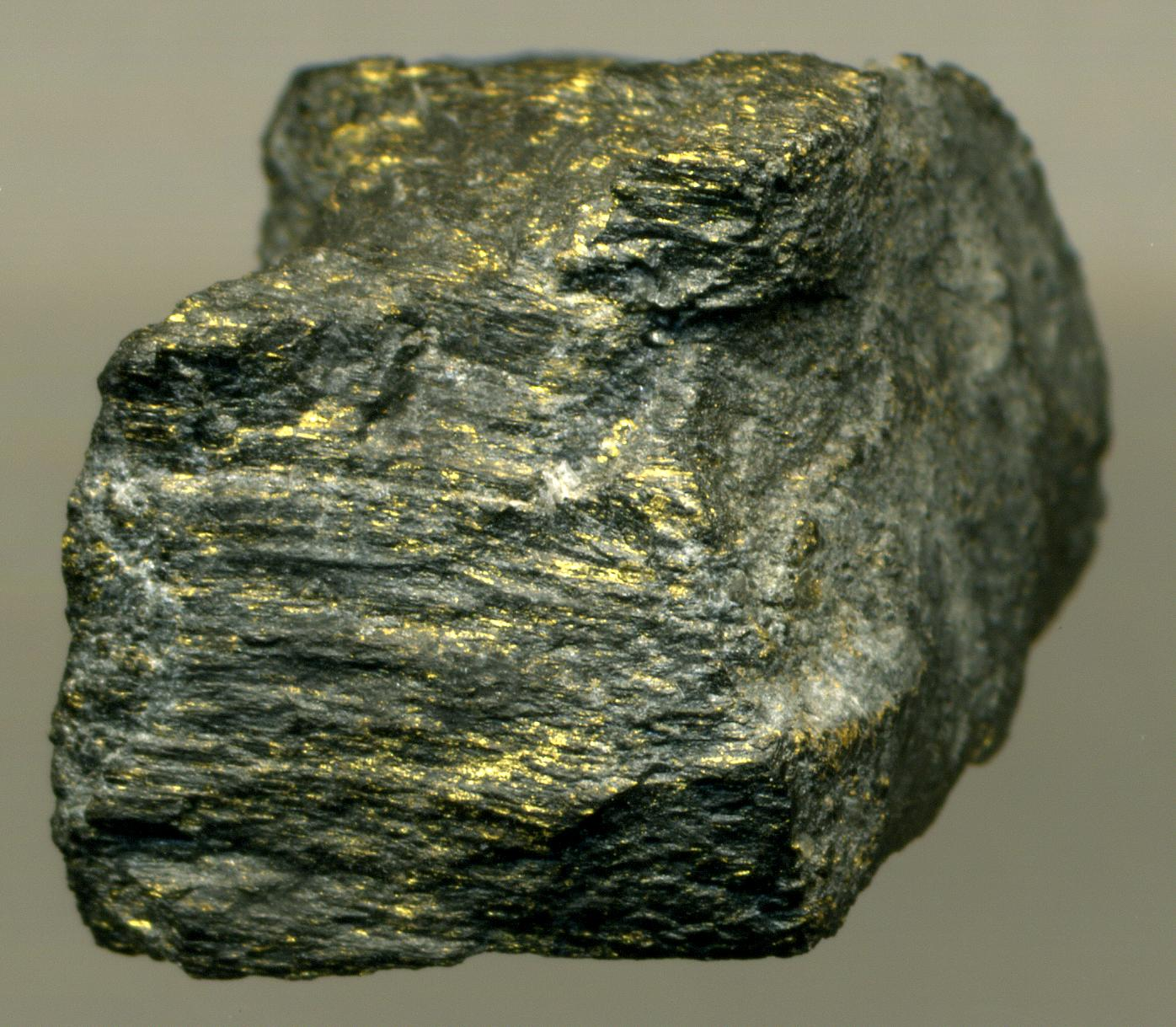
Carbon Leader Gold Ore, Blyvooruitzicht Gold Mine, Carletonville Goldfield, West Witwatersrand. The Carbon Leader is a blackened, hydrocarbon-rich stromatolitic interval richly impregnated with native gold and uraninite. This is a paleoplacer deposit, part of an ancient alluvial fan succession.

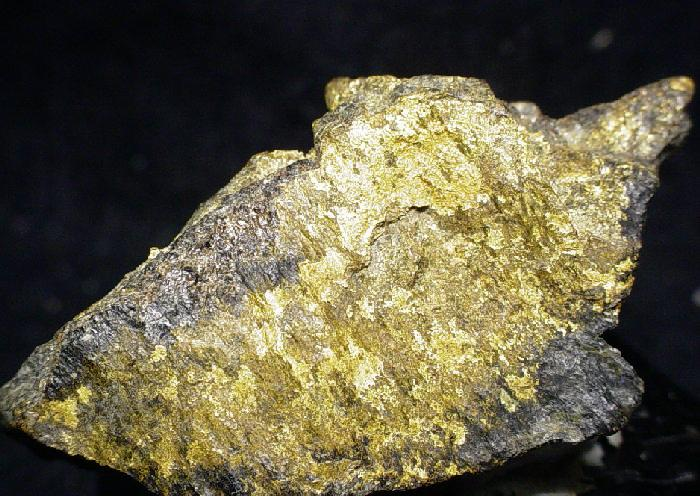
High-grade gold ore from the Witwatersrand near Johannesburg.

The Witwatersrand Basin is a largely underground geological formation which surfaces in the Witwatersrand. It holds the world's largest known gold reserves and has produced over 40000 tonnes (1.3×10^{9} ozt), which represents about 22% of all the gold accounted for above the surface. The basin straddles the old provinces of Transvaal and the Orange Free State, and consists of a 5000–7000 m thick layer of Archean, mainly sedimentary rocks laid down over a period of about 260 million years, starting about 3 billion years ago. The entire series of rocks, known as the "Witwatersrand Supergroup" consists of quartzites, banded ironstones, mudstones, tillites, conglomerates and some marine lava deposits. Most of the basin is deeply buried under younger rocks, but outcrops occur in Gauteng, the Free State, as well as in some of the surrounding Provinces. The outcrop in Gauteng forms the Witwatersrand ridge, from which the basin and its rocks derive their name. It was on the southern portion of this ridge that gold was first discovered on the farm Langlaagte in 1886, 5 km west of Johannesburg. Since this gold was embedded in a conglomerate, it was first assumed that this was alluvial gold in an old riverbed, that had been tilted as a result of earth movements. However, when it was found that, traced downdip, the conglomerate was not merely developed for the narrow width of a river, but continued in depth, there came the realisation that this conglomeratic zone was part of a sedimentary succession. The conglomerate was quickly traced east and westward for a total continuous distance of 50 km (31 mi) to define what became known as the "Central Rand Gold Field".

It has since been established that the rocks that make up the Witwatersrand Ridge dip downwards and southwards to form the largely underground "Witwatersrand Basin" which covers an elliptical area with a 300 km (190 mi) long major axis from Evander in the north-east to Theunissen in the south-west, and 150 km (93 mi) wide stretching from Steynsrus in the south-east to Coligny in the north-west, with a small subsidiary basin at Kinross. Gold occurs only along the northern and western margins of this basin, but not in a continuous band. The gold-bearing rocks are limited to six sites where Archean rivers from the north and west formed fan deltas, with many braided channels, before flowing into the "Witwatersrand Sea" to the south, where the earlier sediments that form the older rocks of the Witwatersrand Supergroup had been deposited. Some of these gold bearing fan deltas are now at depths of 4 km (2.5 mi) below the surface. Although many of the older mines, around Johannesburg, are now nearly exhausted, the Witwatersrand Basin still produces most of South Africa's gold and much of the total world output. Silver, uranium, and iridium are recovered as gold-refining by-products.

=== Geological origin ===
The Witwatersrand basin was created during the Archean Eon, and is therefore amongst the oldest geological structures on Earth. It was laid down in two stages, over the course of 260 million years starting just short of 3 billion years ago. The first phase, lasting 60 million years, consisted of sedimentary deposits in a shallow sea, conveniently named the "Witwatersrand Sea". The resulting 2500–4500 m thick layer of sediments is termed the "West Rand Group" of Witwatersrand rocks. The second phase, which lasted for 200 million years, followed on from the first phase, with on-land deposits, resulting from the retreat of the Witwatersrand Sea, leaving a wide almost flat coastal plain over which rivers from the north formed wide braided river deltas, into some of which rich deposits of gold were deposited. The resulting 2500 m thick layer of rock is termed the "Central Rand Group". The "West Rand Group" and "Central Rand Group" of rocks together form the "Witwatersrand Supergroup", the full horizontal extent of which is termed the Witwatersrand Basin.

A timeline of the Earth's geological history, with an emphasis on events in Southern Africa. W indicates when the Witwatersrand supergroup was laid down, C the Cape supergroup, and K the Karoo Supergroup. The graph also indicates the period during which banded ironstone formations were formed on Earth, indicative of an oxygen-free atmosphere. The Earth's crust was wholly or partially molten during the Hadean Eon; the oldest rocks on Earth are therefore less than 4000 million years old. One of the first microcontinents to form was the Kaapvaal craton.

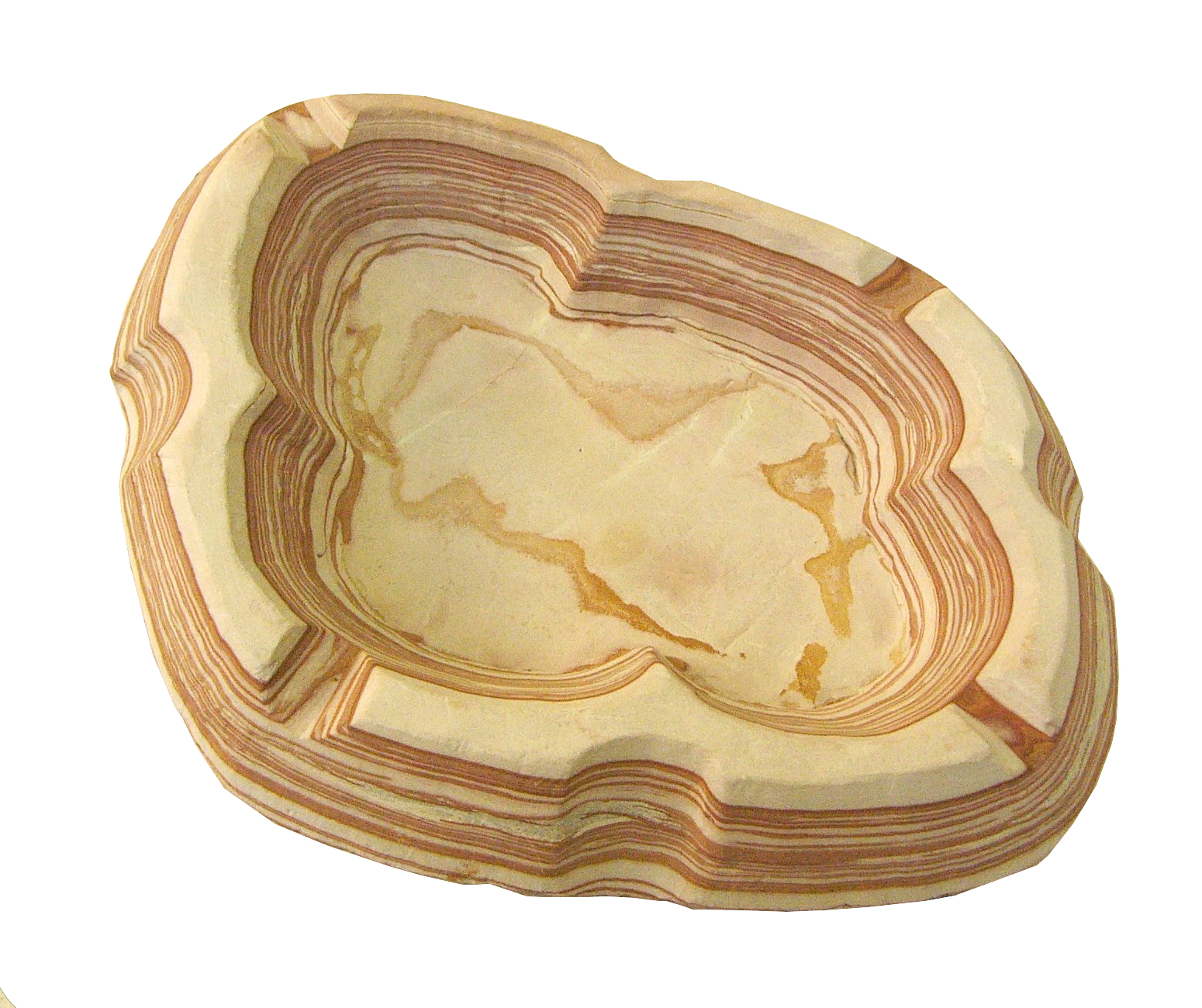
An ashtray carved out of a soft form of banded ironstone. Note the alternating red and beige layers that make up this rock. The red layers are much richer in iron (III) oxides (Fe_{2}O_{3}) and were laid down during time periods when Archean photosynthesizing cyanobacteria produced oxygen that rapidly reacted with the dissolved iron (II) (Fe^{2+}) in water, to form insoluble iron oxide (hematite). The beige layers are sediments that settled during time periods when there was no (or much less) precipitation of iron oxide due to the depletion of dissolved oxygen or Fe^{2+} in water. The earth's atmosphere was oxygen-free until about 2 billion years ago, when the rate of photosynthetic oxygen production began to exceed its rate of reaction with oxidizable substances (i.e. reducing agents such as Fe^{2+}, or HS^{−}).

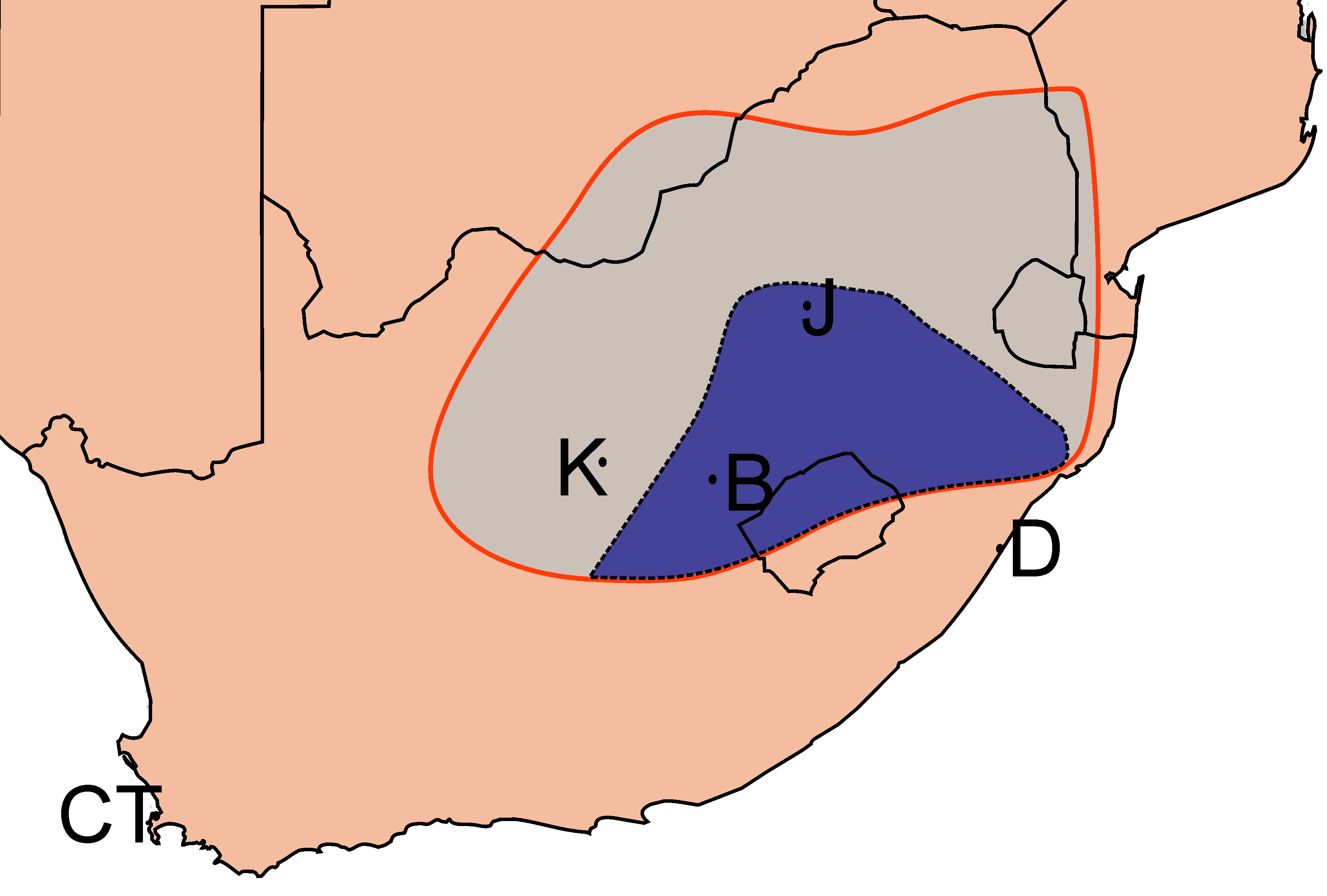
A diagrammatic representation of the position and size of the Kaapvaal craton, outlined in red, in relation to present-day Southern Africa. The blue area depicts the portion of the craton that subsided below the "Witwatersrand Sea", about 3 billion years ago. It is in this sea that the sediments accumulated and would ultimately form the "West Rand Group" portion of the "Witwatersrand Supergroup" of rocks. The younger "Central Rand Group" of rocks accumulated on the low, flat coastal plain (see diagram below) after the Witwatersrand Sea had retreated southwards as a result of uplifting of the craton, especially in the north. CT indicates Cape Town, D Durban, B Bloemfontein, J Johannesburg, and K Kimberley.

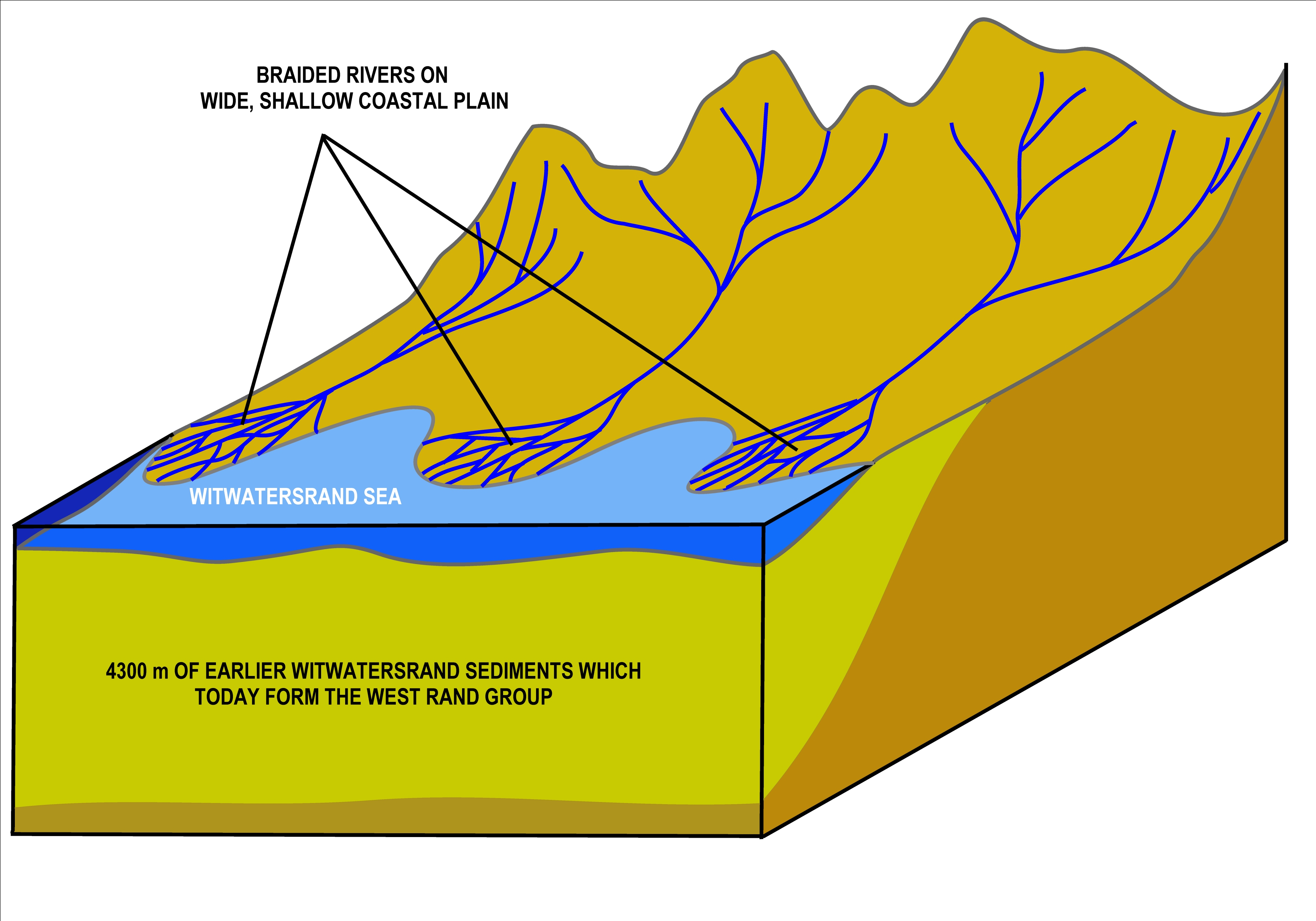
A diagrammatic presentation of the rivers that flowed into the Witwatersrand sea after 43000 m of sediment had already been deposited in the basin. The fast flowing rivers cascading down the mountains to the north now flowed over a wide flat coastal plain to form broad deltas of sluggish braided rivers, where the heavy materials (cobbles, gold, uranium and iron pyrite etc.) carried down from the mountains settled out, to form the gold bearing "Central Rand Group" deposits. Today's gold ore is confined to the fossil river deltas.

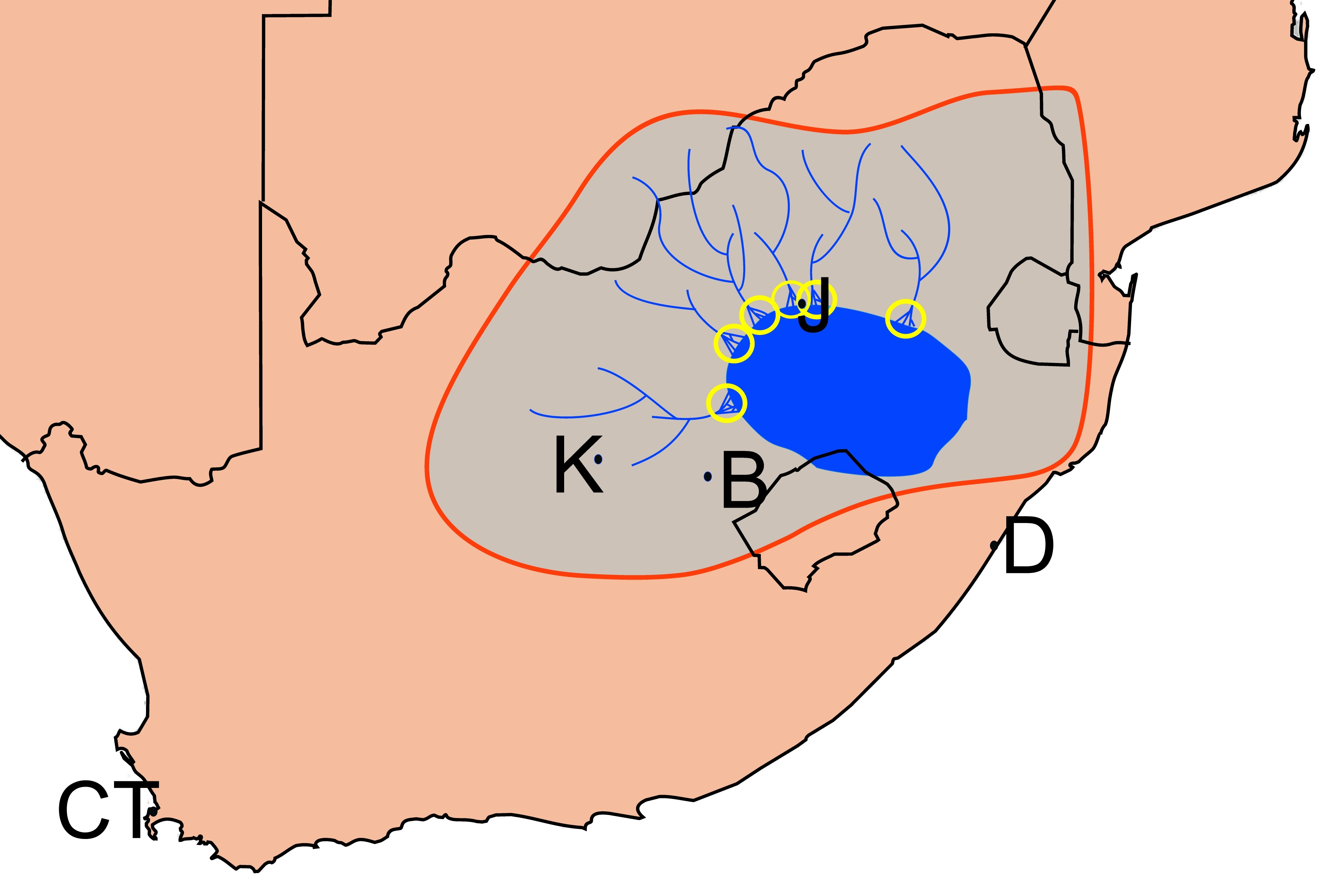
The position of the Kaapvaal craton (khaki coloured area) beneath the South African landscape, and the shrunken, shallow Witwatersrand Sea (light blue) at the time that gold was deposited in the broad, river deltas of six rivers that flowed into that sea, dropping all their heavier materials (cobbles, gold, uranium iron pyrite etc.) in the braided rivers of the deltas (see illustration on the left). Most of these gold deposits are deep under the South African surface, but form outcrops (exposures at the surface) along the Witwatersrand ridge. The six gold fields thus established are, in order from the west, moving clockwise, to the northern shore of the Witwatersrand sea, Welkom, Klerksdorp, Carletonville, West Rand, East Rand and Evander.

There were no continents during the early stages of the Archean Eon, but island arcs did form. It was the coalescence of several of these island arcs that led to the formation of the Kaapvaal craton, one of the first microcontinents to form on Earth about 3.9 billion years ago. Its size and position relative to Southern Africa today are indicated in the diagram on the left. About 3 billion years ago local cooling of the underlying asthenosphere caused subsidence of the south eastern portion of this microcontinent below sea level. The floor of this newly formed "Witwatersrand sea" consisted of smoothly eroded granites. Sandy sediments brought in by rivers from the north started being deposited on the granite about 2.97 billion years ago. This sandy layer eventually became compressed to form the Orange Grove Quartzite, the lowermost layer of the Witwatersrand Supergroup. This quartzite layer can be seen lying on its granite base in Johannesburg, where it forms a 56 km long east–west ridge over which several rivers running to the north form waterfalls, giving rise to the name Witwatersrand, which in Afrikaans means "Ridge of White Waters".

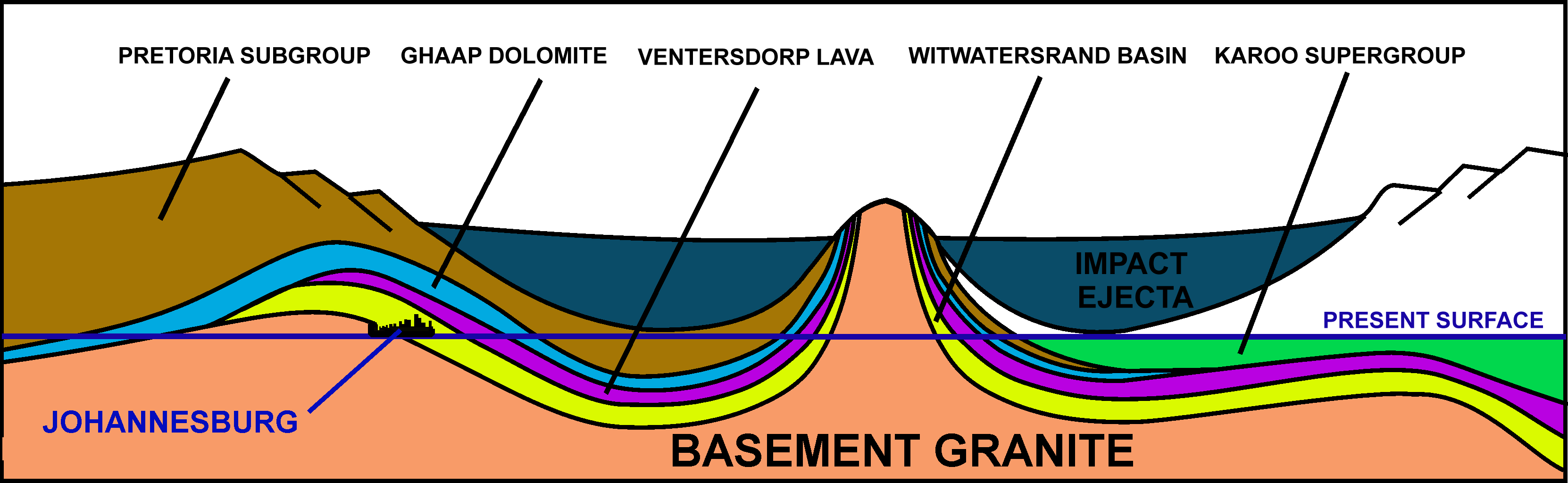
A schematic diagram of a NE (left) to SW (right) cross-section through the 2020 million year old Vredefort impact structure and how it distorted the contemporary geological structures. The present erosion level is shown. Johannesburg is located where the Witwatersrand Basin (yellow layer) is exposed at the "present surface" line, just inside the crater rim, on the left. Not to scale.

There was no free oxygen in Earth's atmosphere until about 2 billion years ago, before the appearance and sufficient development of photosynthesizing cyanobacteria. The oxygen produced by these microorganisms rapidly reacted with, amongst others, Fe^{2+} ions dissolved in water, precipitating insoluble red iron oxide (hematite). For various reasons, the sedimentation of the fine grain mud was affected by cyclic episodes with more or less precipitation of iron oxides. The result was alternating red and beige layers of mud which, when consolidated, became banded ironstones.

As the sea deepened, finer grained and muddy sediments accumulated. Changing geographical conditions resulted in the accumulation of a wide variety of sediments, ranging from mud, to sand, to gravel, and banded ironstones. Tillite deposits, dating from 2.95 billion years ago, are indicative of the first glaciation episodes on earth. Within 60 million years, up to 4500 m of sediment had accumulated on the granite base, to become the "West Rand Group" of rocks that contribute over 60% of the total thickness of the Witwatersrand Supergroup.

Uplifting of the north of the Kaapvaal craton, in addition to orogenesis (mountain formation), towards the end of the deposition of the "West Rand Group" of sediments caused the Witwatersrand sea to retreat. The area of the craton on top of which Johannesburg is now situated, became a vast riverine plain, which extended along the entire northern and western shoreline of the shrunken sea, in an arc extending from Evander in the east, through Johannesburg, Carletonville and then southwards to Klerksdorp and Welkom in the south-west. The rivers formed braided deltas with many interlacing, slow flowing channels where all the heavy materials brought down from the mountains were deposited: large pebbles, and heavy minerals, such as gold, iron pyrite, and uraninite. The gold was in its free elemental form. Cyanobacteria grew in relative abundance in these mineral rich waters. The kerogen, or bitumen, that is found in association with the gold deposits almost certainly represents what remains of these Archean photosynthesizing micro-organisms.

It is clear that for the next 200 million years the flood plain was repeatedly inundated, sometimes eroded, and sediments re-deposited. The result was a 2500 m thick layer of rock that is termed the "Central Rand Group", which together with the "West Rand Group", forms the "Witwatersrand Supergroup". It is the younger Central Rand Group that contains most of the gold bearing conglomerates, locally referred to as banket, that are today of great economic importance.

The "Central Rand Group" of deposits was brought to an abrupt end by massive outpourings of lava, which form the Ventersdorp lavas which erupted 2.715 billion years ago. The cause of these lava outpourings is a matter of speculation. It might be related to the collision of the Kaapvaal craton with the Zimbabwe Craton, eventually to become knitted together to form a single continental unit.

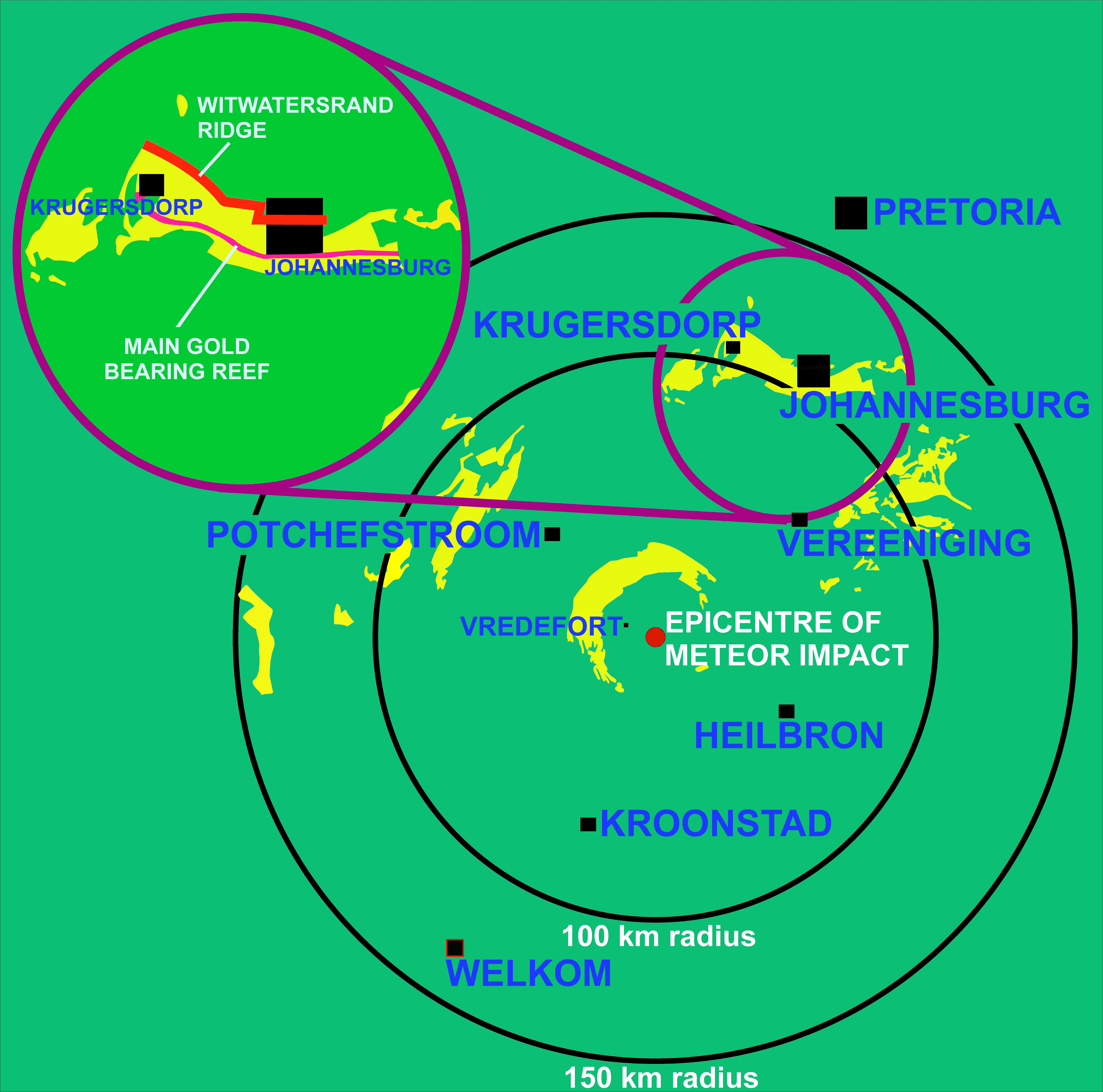
A schematic diagram of the area surrounding the Vredefort Dome, where a massive meteor created an impact crater 300 km in diameter 2,02 billion years ago. The red dot represents the point of impact. The outer circle has a radius of 150 km, and indicates the approximate location of the crater rim. The inner circle marks the 100 km distance from the centre. Note that the outcrops (surface exposures) of Witwatersrand rocks (yellow areas) are located at 25 km from the point of impact and then again at about 80–120 km from the centre. The locations of important towns and cities in the region are indicate in the appropriate places. The red line in the detail of the Johannesburg region shows the location of the scarp/ridge that gave the "Witwatersrand" its name; the purple line the location where the main gold bearing reef is exposed at the surface, just south of Johannesburg.

A final event that had a major impact on the geology of the Witwatersrand Basin and its exposure in the Johannesburg region, was a massive meteor impact 110 km to the south-west of Johannesburg 2.02 billion years ago. The impact was close to the present village of Vredefort, which has given its name to the geological remnant of this immense event: the Vredefort Dome. Not only are the remains of this impact among the oldest on Earth, but it is also one of the largest meteor impacts to have left its imprint on present-day Earth geology. A meteor 10–15 km across created a 300 km diameter crater, distorting all the rock strata within that circle. Johannesburg is just within the outer edge of this impact crater. In the immediate vicinity of the impact all the subterranean strata were uplifted and upturned, so that Witwatersrand rocks are exposed in an arc 25 km away from the impact centre. There are no gold deposits in these outcrops. The meteor impact, however, lowered the Witwatersrand basin inside the crater. This protected it from erosion later on; but, possibly more importantly, bringing it to the surface close to the crater rim, near Johannesburg. In fact, apart from the Witwatersrand outcrops (i.e. where these rocks are exposed at the surface) in the immediate vicinity of the Vredefort Dome, virtually all the other outcrops occur in an arc approximately 80–120 km from the centre of the impact crater, to the west, north-west, north and north-east. Thus, it is possible that if it had not been for the Vredefort asteroid strike 2 billion years ago, humanity would either never have discovered the rich gold deposits beneath the Southern African surface, or they would have been eroded away during the uninterrupted removal of a several kilometres thick layer of deposits from the surface of the Southern African Plateau in the relatively recent geological past: i.e. the past 150 million years, but especially during the last 20 million years.

=== Gold origin ===
The vast majority of the Earth's gold and other heavy metals are locked up in the earth's core. Evidence from tungsten isotope studies indicates that most gold in the crust is derived from gold in the mantle which resulted from a meteorite bombardment some 3.9 billion years ago (i.e., at approximately the time that the Kaapvaal craton formed). The gold bearing meteorite events occurred millions of years after the segregation of the Earth's core. The gold in the Witwatersrand Basin area was deposited in Archean river deltas having been washed down from surrounding gold-rich greenstone belts to the north and west. Rhenium-osmium isotope studies indicate that the gold in those mineral deposits came from unusual 3 billion year old mantle-derived intrusions known as komatiite, present in the greenstone belts.

== Consequences of mining the ancient Witwatersrand rocks ==
Apart from the obvious hollowing out of the rocks below southern Johannesburg, causing unpredictable sinkholes, surface instabilities and earth tremors, the bringing to the surface of rocks that had been laid down in oxygen-free conditions had unforeseen effects. Iron pyrite (FeS_{2}), which is relatively plentiful in the gold ores of the Witwatersrand, oxidises to insoluble ferric oxide (Fe_{2}O_{3}) and sulfuric acid (H_{2}SO_{4}). Thus, when mine waste comes into contact with oxygenated rainwater, sulfuric acid is released into the ground water. Acid mine drainage, as the phenomenon is called, has become a major ecological problem, because it dissolves many of the heavy elements, such as the uranium, cadmium, lead, zinc, copper, arsenic and mercury found in the mine dumps, facilitating their passage into surface water and ground water. The tailings ponds contain an average of 100 mg/kg of U_{3}O_{8}, and uranium levels are measureable in human hair.

Sulfuric acid also erodes concrete and cement structures, resulting in structural damage to buildings and bridges.

== History ==
Although gold had been discovered in various locations in South Africa, such as Barberton and Pilgrim's Rest, as well as at several sites near the Witwatersrand, these were alluvial concentrates in contemporary rivers, or in quartz veins, in the form that gold had always been found elsewhere on earth. When George Harrison, probably accompanied by George Walker, found gold on the farm Langlaagte, 5 km (3 mi) west of what would become the city of Johannesburg, in an outcrop of conglomerate rocks, in February 1886, they assumed that this was alluvial gold in an old riverbed, that had been tilted as a result of earth movements. However, when it was found that, traced downdip, the conglomerate was not merely developed for the narrow width of a river, but continued in depth, there came the realisation that this conglomeratic zone was part of a sedimentary succession. Harrison had stumbled on the Main Reef conglomerate (part of the "Johannesburg Subgroup" of rocks — see illustration above). The conglomerate was quickly traced east and westward for a total continuous distance of 50 km (31 mi) to define what became known as the "Central Rand Gold Field".

Gold production on the Witwatersrand 1898 to 1910
Year	No. of mines	Gold output fine (troy) ounces	Value (million GBP)	
Year	No. of mines	Gold output fine (troy) ounces	In given year	Revalued to 2010
1898	77	4295608	£15.14	£6910
1899 (Jan–Oct)	85	3946545	£14.05	£6300
1899 Nov – 1901 Apr	12	574043	£2.02	£908
1901 (May–Dec)	12	238994	£1.01	£441
1902	45	1690100	£7.18	£3090
1903	56	2859482	£12.15	£5220
1904	62	3658241	£15.54	£6640
1905	68	4706433	£19.99	£8490
1906	66	5559534	£23.62	£9890
1907	68	6220227	£26.42	£10800
1908	74	6782538	£28.81	£11700
1909	72	7039136	£29.90	£12200
1910	63	7228311	£30.70	£12400

Harrison declared his claim to the government of the Zuid Afrikaanse Republiek (ZAR), and in September 1886 President Paul Kruger issued a proclamation declaring nine farms public mining diggings, starting on 20 September 1886. This heralded the historic Witwatersrand Gold Rush. Harrison is believed to have sold his claim for less than £10 before leaving the area, and he was never heard from again.

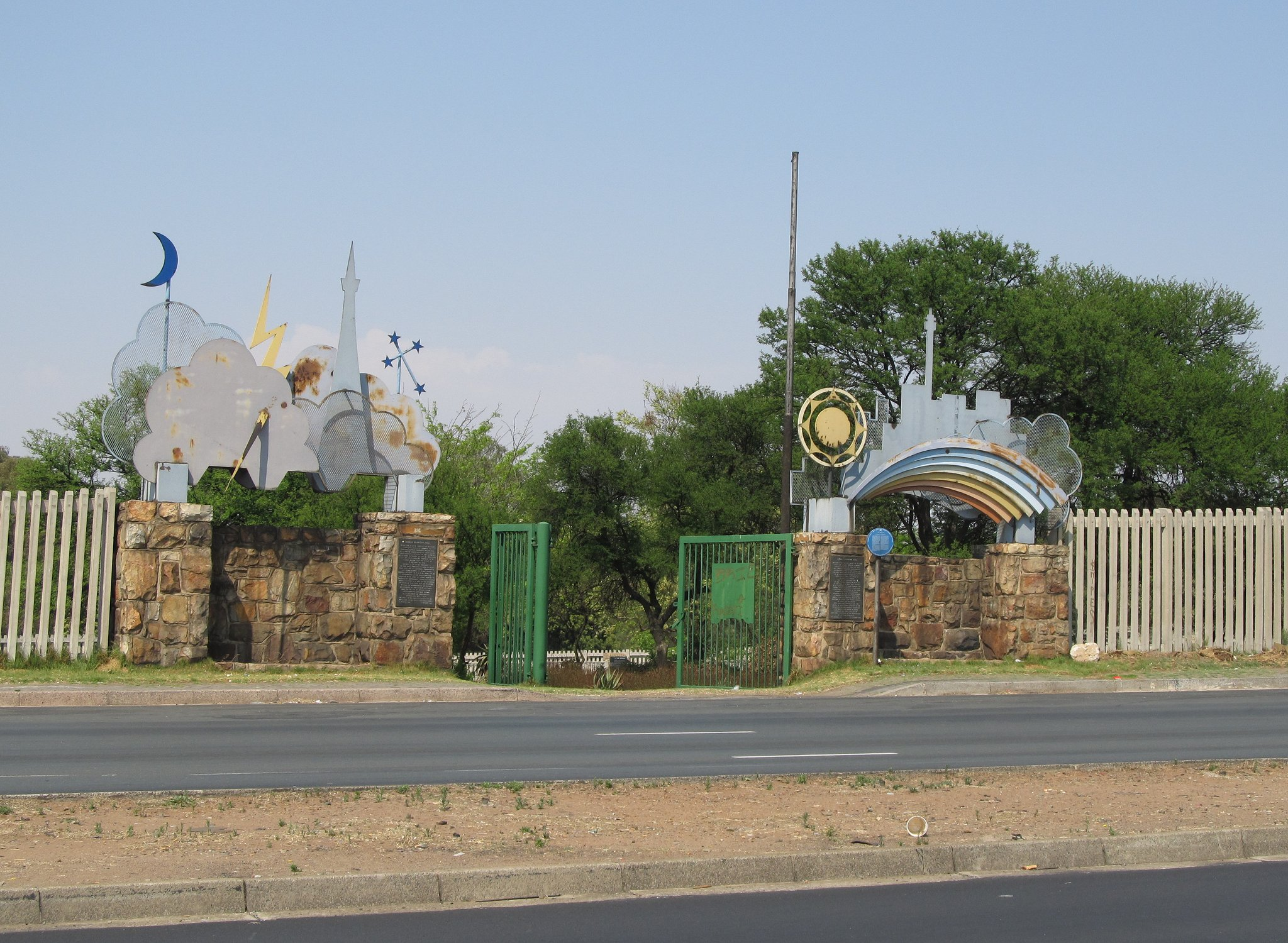
The street entrance of George Harrison Park

Harrison's original Zoekers' (in English: seekers', or prospectors') Claim No 19 was declared a national monument in 1944, and named Harrison's Park. The park is on the busy Main Reef Road, immediately west of Nasrec Road. In 1887 Cecil John Rhodes registered "The Gold Fields of South Africa" in London, South Africa's first mining house, with a capital of £250000. His brother Thomas was the first chairman.

== See also ==
- Geography of South Africa
- Great Escarpment, Southern Africa
- Borakalalo Game Reserve
- Pilanesberg
- List of mountain ranges of South Africa
- Witwatersrand Gold Rush
- Qala Shallows Gold Mine
- Thuchomyces
