= Archean =

Geologic eon, 4031–2500 million years ago

- 4031 ± 3 – 2500 Ma
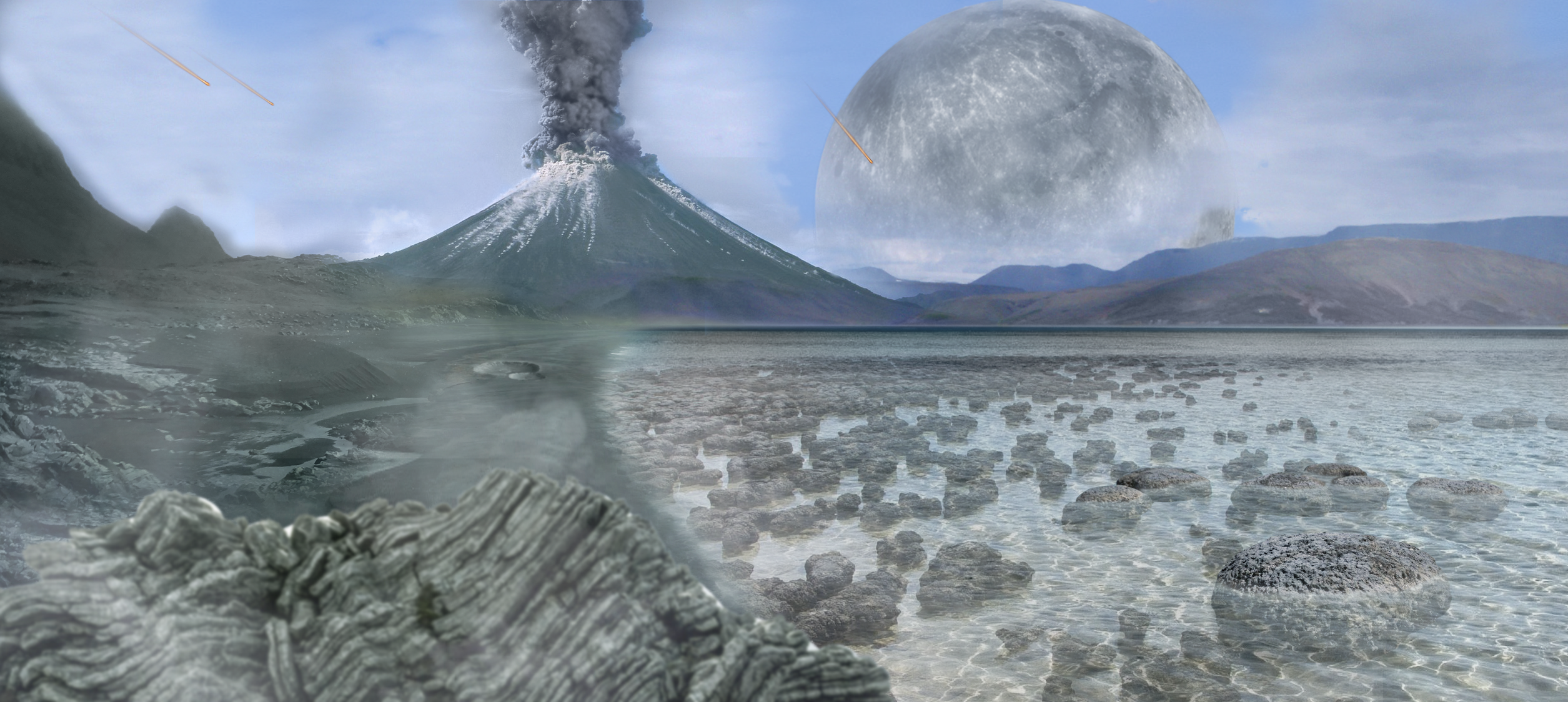
- Artist's impression of an Archean landscape

Chronology
Vertical axis scale: Millions of years ago

Etymology
- Name formality: Formal
- Alternate spelling(s): Archaean, Archæan
- Synonym(s): Eozoic; J.W. Dawson, 1865

Usage information
- Celestial body: Earth
- Regional usage: Global (ICS)
- Time scale(s) used: ICS Time Scale

Definition
- Chronological unit: Eon
- Stratigraphic unit: Eonothem
- Time span formality: Formal
- Lower boundary definition: Ten oldest U-Pb zircon ages
- Lower boundary GSSA: Along the Acasta River, Northwest Territories, Canada; 65.1738°N 115.5538°W
- Lower GSSA ratified: 2023
- Upper boundary definition: Defined Chronometrically
- Upper GSSA ratified: 1990

The Archean (IPA: /ɑːrˈkiːən/ ar-KEE-ən, also spelled Archaean or Archæan), in older sources sometimes called the Archaeozoic, is the second of the four geologic eons of Earth's history, preceded by the Hadean Eon and followed by the Proterozoic and the Phanerozoic. The Archean represents the time period from 4,031 to 2,500 Ma (million years ago). The Late Heavy Bombardment is hypothesized to overlap with the beginning of the Archean. The oldest known glaciation occurred in the middle of the eon.

The Earth during the Archean was mostly a water world: there was continental crust, but much of it was under a superocean deeper than today's oceans. Except for some rare relict crystals (Hadean zircon), today's oldest continental crust dates back to the Archean. Much of the geological detail of the Archean has been destroyed by subsequent tectonic activity. The Earth's atmosphere was also vastly different in composition from today's: the prebiotic atmosphere was a reducing atmosphere rich in methane and lacking free oxygen.

The earliest known life, mostly represented by shallow-water microbial mats called stromatolites, started in the Archean and remained simple prokaryotes (archaea and bacteria) throughout the eon. The earliest photosynthetic processes, especially those by early cyanobacteria, appeared in the mid/late Archean and led to a permanent chemical change in the ocean and the atmosphere after the Archean.

== Etymology and changes in classification ==
The word Archean is derived from the Greek word arkhē (ἀρχή), meaning 'beginning, origin'. The Pre-Cambrian had been believed to be without life (azoic); however, fossils were found in deposits that were judged to belong to the Azoic age. Before the Hadean Eon was recognized, the Archean spanned Earth's early history from its formation about 4,540 Ma until 2,500 Ma.

Instead of being based on stratigraphy, the beginning and end of the Archean Eon are defined chronometrically. The eon's lower boundary or starting point of 4,031±3 Ma is officially recognized by the International Commission on Stratigraphy, which is the age of the oldest known intact rock formations on Earth. Evidence of rocks from the preceding Hadean Eon are therefore restricted by definition to non-rock and non-terrestrial sources such as individual mineral grains and lunar samples.

== Geology ==
When the Archean began, the Earth's heat flow was nearly three times as high as it is today, and it was still twice the current level at the transition from the Archean to the Proterozoic (2,500 Ma). The extra heat was partly remnant heat from planetary accretion, from the formation of the metallic core, and partly arose from the decay of radioactive elements. As a result, the Earth's mantle was significantly hotter than today.

The evolution of Earth's radiogenic heat flow over time

Although a few mineral grains have survived from the Hadean, the oldest rock formations exposed on the surface of the Earth are Archean. Archean rocks are found in Greenland, Siberia, the Canadian Shield, Montana, Wyoming (exposed parts of the Wyoming Craton), Minnesota (Minnesota River Valley), the Baltic Shield, the Rhodope Massif, Scotland, India, Brazil, western Australia, and southern Africa. Granitic rocks predominate throughout the crystalline remnants of the surviving Archean crust. These include great melt sheets and voluminous plutonic masses of granite, diorite, layered intrusions, anorthosites and monzonites known as sanukitoids. Archean rocks are often heavily metamorphosed deep-water sediments, such as graywackes, mudstones, volcanic sediments, and banded iron formations. Volcanic activity was considerably higher than today, with numerous lava eruptions, including unusual types such as komatiite. Carbonate rocks are rare, indicating that the oceans were more acidic, due to dissolved carbon dioxide, than during the Proterozoic. Greenstone belts are typical Archean formations, consisting of alternating units of metamorphosed mafic igneous and sedimentary rocks, including Archean felsic volcanic rocks. The metamorphosed igneous rocks were derived from volcanic island arcs, while the metamorphosed sediments represent deep-sea sediments eroded from the neighboring island arcs and deposited in a forearc basin. Greenstone belts, which include both types of metamorphosed rock, represent sutures between the protocontinents.

Plate tectonics likely started vigorously in the Hadean, but slowed down in the Archean. The slowing of plate tectonics was probably due to an increase in the viscosity of the mantle due to outgassing of its water. Plate tectonics likely produced large amounts of continental crust, but the deep oceans of the Archean probably covered the continents entirely. Only at the end of the Archean did the continents likely emerge from the ocean. The emergence of continents towards the end of the Archaean initiated continental weathering that left its mark on the oxygen isotope record by enriching seawater with isotopically light oxygen.

Due to recycling and metamorphism of the Archean crust, there is a lack of extensive geological evidence for specific continents. One hypothesis is that rocks that are now in India, western Australia, and southern Africa formed a continent called Ur as of 3,100 Ma. Another hypothesis, which conflicts with the first, is that rocks from western Australia and southern Africa were assembled in a continent called Vaalbara as far back as 3,600 Ma. Archean rock makes up only about 8% of Earth's present-day continental crust; the rest of the Archean continents have been recycled.

By the Neoarchean, plate tectonic activity may have been similar to that of the modern Earth, although there was a significantly greater occurrence of slab detachment resulting from a hotter mantle, rheologically weaker plates, and increased tensile stresses on subducting plates due to their crustal material metamorphosing from basalt into eclogite as they sank. There are well-preserved sedimentary basins, and evidence of volcanic arcs, intracontinental rifts, continent-continent collisions and widespread globe-spanning orogenic events suggesting the assembly and destruction of one and perhaps several supercontinents. Evidence from banded iron formations, chert beds, chemical sediments and pillow basalts demonstrates that liquid water was prevalent and deep oceanic basins already existed.

Asteroid impacts were frequent in the early Archean. Evidence from spherule layers suggests that impacts continued into the later Archean, at an average rate of about one impactor with a diameter greater than 10 kilometers (6 mi) every 15 million years. This is about the size of the Chicxulub impactor. These impacts would have been an important oxygen sink and would have caused drastic fluctuations of atmospheric oxygen levels.

== Environment ==
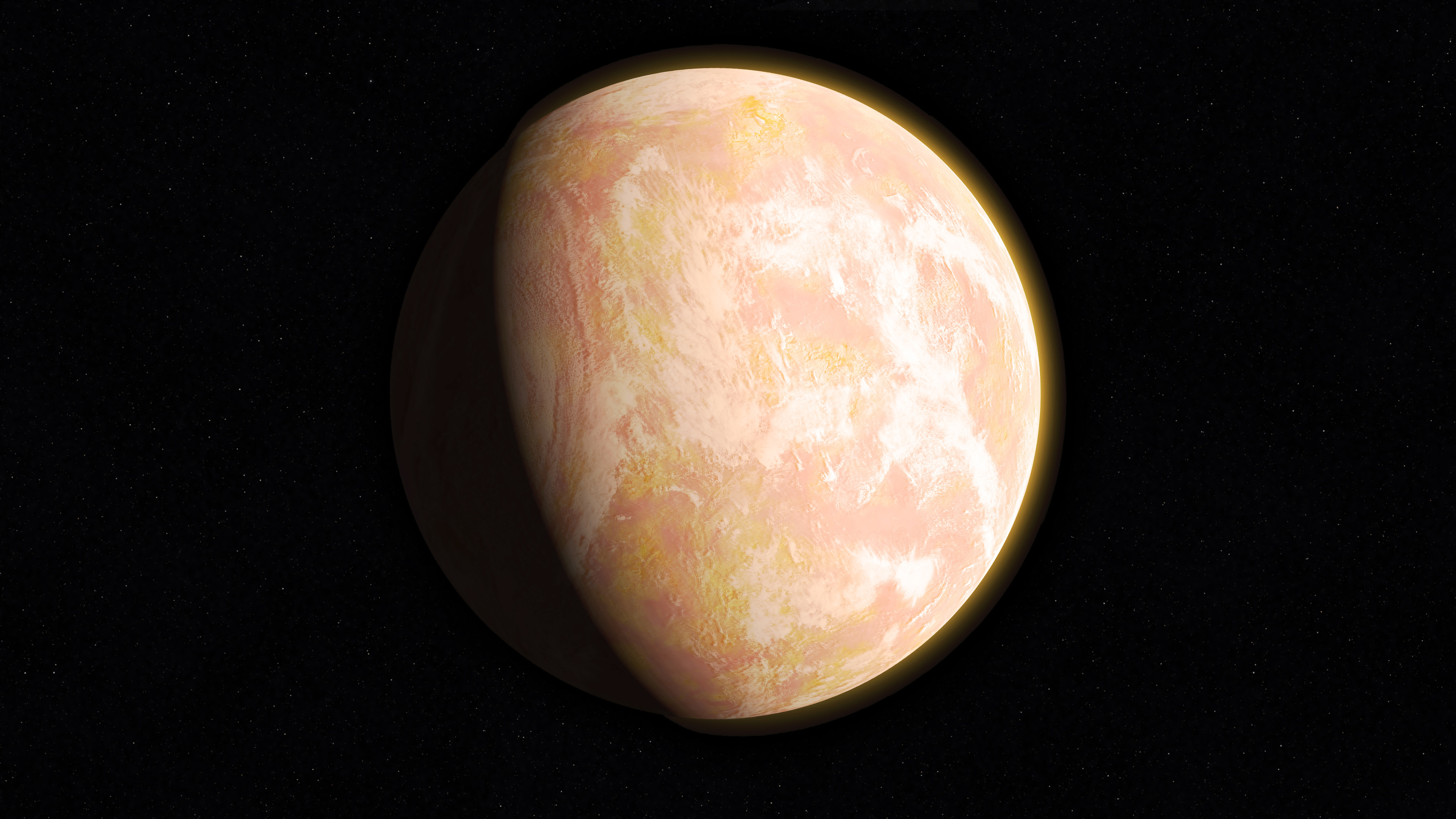
The pale orange dot, an artist's impression of the early Earth which is believed to have appeared orange through its hazy, methane rich, prebiotic secondary atmosphere. Earth's atmosphere at this stage was somewhat comparable to today's atmosphere of Titan.

The Archean atmosphere is thought to have almost completely lacked free oxygen; oxygen levels were less than 0.001% of their present atmospheric level, with some analyses suggesting they were as low as 0.00001% of modern levels. However, transient episodes of heightened oxygen concentrations are known from this eon around 2,980–2,960 Ma, 2,700 Ma, and 2,501 Ma. The pulses of increased oxygenation at 2,700 and 2,501 Ma have both been considered by some as potential start points of the Great Oxygenation Event, which most scholars consider to have begun in the Palaeoproterozoic (c. 2,400 Ma). Furthermore, oases of relatively high oxygen levels existed in some nearshore shallow marine settings by the Mesoarchean. The ocean was broadly reducing and lacked any persistent redoxcline, a water layer between oxygenated and anoxic layers with a strong redox gradient, which would become a feature in later, more oxic oceans. Despite the lack of free oxygen, the rate of organic carbon burial appears to have been roughly the same as in the present. Due to extremely low oxygen levels, sulphate was rare in the Archean ocean, and sulphides were produced primarily through reduction of organically sourced sulphite or through mineralisation of compounds containing reduced sulphur. The Archean ocean was enriched in heavier oxygen isotopes relative to the modern ocean, though δ18O values decreased to levels comparable to those of modern oceans over the course of the later part of the eon as a result of increased continental weathering.

Astronomers think that the Sun had about 75–80 percent of its present luminosity, yet temperatures on Earth appear to have been near modern levels only 500 million years after Earth's formation (the faint young Sun paradox). The presence of liquid water is evidenced by certain highly deformed gneisses produced by metamorphism of sedimentary protoliths. The moderate temperatures may reflect the presence of greater amounts of greenhouse gases than later in the Earth's history. Extensive abiotic denitrification took place on the Archean Earth, pumping the greenhouse gas nitrous oxide into the atmosphere. Alternatively, Earth's albedo may have been lower at the time, due to less land area and cloud cover.

== Early life ==
Earth was very hostile to life before 4.3 to 4.2 billion years ago, and the conclusion is that before the Archean Eon, life as we know it would have been challenged by these environmental conditions. While life could have arisen before the Archean, the conditions necessary to sustain life could not have occurred until the Archean Eon.

The earliest evidence for life on Earth was thought to be graphite of biogenic origin found in 3.7 billion–year-old metasedimentary rocks discovered in Western Greenland. However, the biological nature of those structures was since questioned in a 2018 study.

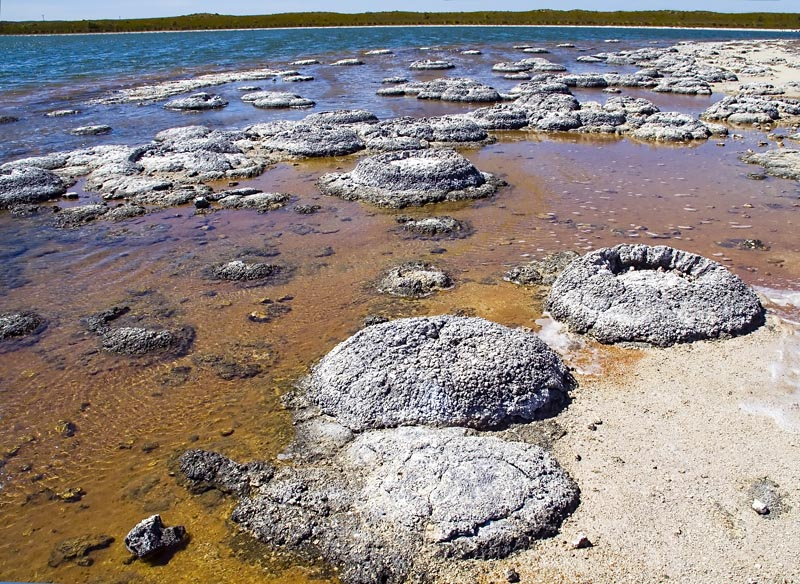
Lithified stromatolites on the shores of Lake Thetis, Western Australia. Archean stromatolites are the first direct fossil traces of life on Earth.

The earliest identifiable fossils consist of stromatolites, which are microbial mats formed in shallow water by cyanobacteria. The earliest stromatolites are found in 3.48 billion-year-old sandstone discovered in Western Australia. Stromatolites are found throughout the Archean and become common late in the Archean. Cyanobacteria were instrumental in creating free oxygen in the atmosphere.

Further evidence for early life is found in 3.47 billion-year-old baryte, in the Warrawoona Group of Western Australia. This mineral shows sulfur fractionation of as much as 21.1%, which is evidence of sulfate-reducing bacteria that metabolize sulfur-32 more readily than sulfur-34.

Evidence of life in the late Hadean is more controversial. In 2015, biogenic carbon was detected in zircons dated to 4.1 billion years ago, but this evidence is preliminary and needs validation.

Life in the Archean was limited to simple single-celled organisms (lacking nuclei), called prokaryotes. In addition to the domain Bacteria, microfossils of the domain Archaea have also been identified. There are no known eukaryotic fossils from the earliest Archean, though they might have evolved during the Archean without leaving any. Fossil steranes, indicative of eukaryotes, have been reported from Archean strata but were shown to derive from contamination with younger organic matter. No fossil evidence has been discovered for ultramicroscopic intracellular replicators such as viruses.

Fossilized microbes from terrestrial microbial mats show that life was already established on land 3.22 Ga.

Thuchomyces, a Mesoarchean-Neoarchean fossil from South Africa, may be the first evidence of macroscopic land life, however it is likely a microbial mat due to a lack of eukaryotic features.

== See also ==
- Abiogenesis – Life arising from non-living matter
- Cosmic Calendar – Method to visualize the chronology of the universe
- Earliest known life forms
- Geologic time scale – System that relates geologic strata to time
- Geological history of oxygen
- History of Earth – Records of Earth's development
- Precambrian – History of Earth 4600–539 million years ago
- Timeline of natural history
- Archean felsic volcanic rocks – Felsic volcanic rocks formed in the Archean Eon
