= Azoic Age =

Azoic Age, Azoic Era, Azoic Period and Azoic Eon were terms used before 1950 to describe the age of rocks formed before the appearance of life in the geologic sequence. The word "Azoic" is derived from the Greek a- meaning without and zoön meaning animal (or living being), meaning without life. This name was given because rocks from this era were first thought to possess no fossil record.

Azoic was used as early as 1846 by a geologist named Adams, and gradually replaced the earlier term Primitive. Due to the controversy over evolution, "Azoic" was replaced, by 1900, in most usages by the term "Archaean" or "Archaeozoic The Archaean was later subdivided into the Archaean and the even earlier Hadean. Many of the rocks that had originally been thought to be of Azoic time were reclassified as Archaean, but the period itself is now essentially the Hadean.

J.D. Dana in 1863, wrote that the Azoic "stands as the first [age] in geologic history, whether science can point out unquestionably the rocks of that age or not." He also wrote that when fossils had been found in strata which had previously been classified as Azoic, the boundary was simply moved lower.

== Reclassification ==
The oldest fossils, found in what was previously called Azoic rock, established the geological boundary between the Precambrian and Cambrian. These terms have thereby supplanted "Azoic".
