= Banket (mining term) =

Bed of auriferous conglomerate

Banket, a South African mining term, applied to the beds of auriferous conglomerate, chiefly occurring in the Witwatersrand gold-fields. The name was given to these beds from their resemblance to a pastry, known in Dutch as banket, resembling almond hard-bake. The word is the same as banquet, and is derived ultimately from bank or bench, meaning table-feast, hence applied to any delicacy or to various kinds of confectionery, a use now obsolete in English.
