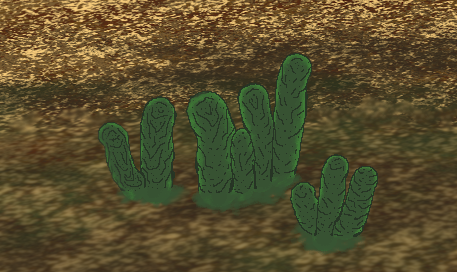
- Reconstruction of Thuchomyces in an Archean soil.

Scientific classification
- (unranked): incertae sedis
- Genus: †Thuchomyces; Hallbauer & Jahns, 1977
- Species: †T. lichenoides

Binomial name
- †Thuchomyces lichenoides Hallbauer & Jahns, 1977

= Thuchomyces =

Thuchomyces Temporal range: Archean, 2800 Ma

Genus of problematic fossil

Thuchomyces (sometimes mistakenly called “Thucomyces”) is a genus of Archean fossils from the Witwatersrand of South Africa, and is the earliest macroscopic land life known. The generic name derives from thucholite, the carbonaceous material which Thuchomyces is preserved in, and the Ancient Greek word "myces", meaning "fungus". The specific name, lichenoides, derives from its similarity to some modern lichens.

== Description ==
Thuchomyces resembles modern columnar biomats, alongside certain lichens, however the latter are far more recent, only having appeared at most 300 million years ago, and therefore it almost certainly is not a lichen, or even a eukaryote at all. Some fossils have a round structure at their tip, interpreted as a diaspore, and these structures can also be observed in the rock surrounding the fossils. The internal structure of Thuchomyces consists of a network of hyphae, made of intensely branching cells possibly connected via anastomoses. The outer layer of the organism consists of highly agglutinated hyphae with a layer of loose tissue inside it, alongside a "central cord" observed in immature specimens which disappears with age. Thuchomyces columns are roughly 200–500 micrometers across, and reach a height of roughly 1 mm. Thuchomyces shares many similarities with the Paleoproterozoic Diskagma, having a similar size and shape, alongside both forming dense palisades on paleosols. However it lacks the spines of Diskagma and has complex vertical partitions, alongside having rounded terminations instead of the cup-like tips of Diskagma.

== Paleoecology ==
Taking into account various features such as ventifacts, the concentration of carbon-13 in the rock and other geological features, the sediments Thuchomyces is known from are interpreted as being a wind-blasted desert environment crossed by ephemeral streams, which was occasionally flooded. In addition another organism named Witwateromyces conidiophorus, a possible actinomycete bacterium, was found associated with Thuchomyces, possibly as a decomposer.
