= Pongola glaciation =

Glacial episode

The Pongola glaciation was a glacial period that occurred in the Mesoarchean, from around 2.985-2.837 billion years ago. It is the oldest known glaciation on Earth.

== Geology ==
The oldest known traces of glaciation date from the Mesoarchean. They correspond to the diamictite of the Pongola supergroup (more precisely to the Mozaan formation,) in KwaZulu-Natal and in Eswatini.

== Climate ==
Even if the climate of the Mesoarchean is not well known, the study of the oxygen isotopes in the cherts of the time seem to show that the climate of the Mesoarchean was warm or, at least, temperate, in particular due to high levels of methane and carbon dioxide in the atmosphere; a glaciation is therefore likely to have been caused by a drop in the rate of these greenhouse gases. The Pongola glaciation is also associated with changes in sulfur isotopes (δ^{34}S), suggesting that this may also involve early and short-lived oxygenation of the Earth's atmosphere.

== Extension ==
The extension of the glaciation is not determined with certainty. Some authors argue that the glacial deposits were formed at low latitudes, below 30° N, therefore close to the tropics, which would imply extensive glaciation, while others argue that the area was located at mid-latitude or even high latitude, closer to the pole, where a polar glacier could have formed, like the current situation.

Regarding its duration, the corresponding glacial deposits fall within the interval 2.985 ± 1 and 2.837 ± 5 Bya.

== See also ==
- Huronian glaciation

== Bibliography ==
- Deconinck, J.F. "Variabilité climatique et cycles géodynamiques" (PDF) (in French). CNRS.
- "Pongola supergroup. The first record of ancient life". University of KwaZulu-Natal.
- Young, Grant M.; von Brunn, Victor; Gold, Digby J. C.; Minter, W. E. L. (1998). "Earth's Oldest Reported Glaciation: Physical and Chemical Evidence from the Archean Mozaan Group (~2.9 Ga) of South Africa". The Journal of Geology. 106 (5): 523-538. doi:10.1086/516039. S2CID 129717765.
- Kopp, Robert E.; Kirschvink, Joseph L.; Hilburn, Isaac A.; Nash, Cody Z. (9 August 2005). "The Paleoproterozoic snowball Earth: A climate disaster triggered by the evolution of oxygenic photosynthesis". PNAS. 102 (32): 11131–11136. doi:10.1073/pnas.0504878102. PMC 1183582. PMID 16061801.
- Gold, D.J.C.; Johnson, M.R.; Anhaeusser, C.R.; Thomas, Bob (2006). "The Pongola Supergroup. The geology of South Africa". Geol. Soc. South Afr.: 135-148.
- Kasting, James F.; Ono, Shuhei (29 June 2006). "Palaeoclimates: the first two billion years". Philosophical Transactions B. 361 (1470): 917–929. doi:10.1098/rstb.2006.1839. PMC 1868609. PMID 16754607.
- Kasting, James F.; Howard, M. Tazewell (29 October 2006). "Atmospheric composition and climate on the early Earth". Philosophical Transactions B. 361 (1474): 1733–1742. doi:10.1098/rstb.2006.1902. PMC 1664689. PMID 17008214.
- Antarctica: A Keystone in a Changing World. National Academies Press. 2008. ISBN 9780309118545.
- Zalasiewicz, Jan; Williams, Mark (2012). The Goldilocks Planet: The 4 billion year story of Earth's climate. Oxford University Press. ISBN 978-0-19-959357-6.
- Alain R. Meunier (2014). La naissance de la Terre (in French). Dunod. p. 235.
- El Albani, Abderrazak; Macchiarelli, Roberto; Meunier, Alain R. (2016). Aux origines de la vie: Une nouvelle histoire de l'évolution (in French). Dunod. ISBN 9782100748259.
