= Geology of Africa =

Motion of the Nubian (purple, center) and Somali (green, right) Plates

Central African Shear Zone

The geology of Africa is varied, complex, and gives rise to the wide variety of landscapes found across the continent.

The African continent rests over two main plates. The African Plate (Nubian Plate), accounting for the whole of north Africa, and the Somali Plate, which accounts for the eastern side of mid and southern Africa. The Somali Plate is moving away from the African Plate in a split from Djibouti in the north, to Eswatini in the south. The parting of these two plates formed the southern part of what used to be known as the Great Rift Valley. In geological terms, the African and Somali plate separation has formed the East African Rift System (EARS), comprising two separate rifts systems - the Eastern Rift Valley, and a western branch known as the Albertine Rift.

Two massive domes were formed, the Kenyan dome and the Ethiopian dome (known as the Ethiopian Highlands). The Albertine Rift follows the western edge of the Kenyan dome. This runs from Lake Malawi in the south, up into Lake Rukwa, Lake Tanganyika and Lake Albert in the north, where it ends. The Kenyan dome has the eastern branch of the EARS (known as the Gregory Rift) running through its middle, and contains most of what we historically saw as the Great Rift valley. Lake Victoria lies in the middle of the dome, with the Gregory Rift to the east of it. The Gregory rift has Lake Eyasi & Lake Manyara at its southern end, running north up to the west of Nairobi and continuing on through Kenya to Lake Turkana - which lies between the northern edge of the Kenyan dome and the southern edge of the Ethiopian dome. The Ethiopian dome is split down the middle by the Eastern Rift, formed by the developing plate boundary, and has formed a valley running from Lake Chamo and Lake Abaya in the south, widening through Lake Shala, Lake Ziwa and Lake Koku, until it reaches its widest point some 110 kilometres (68 mi) from Djibouti.

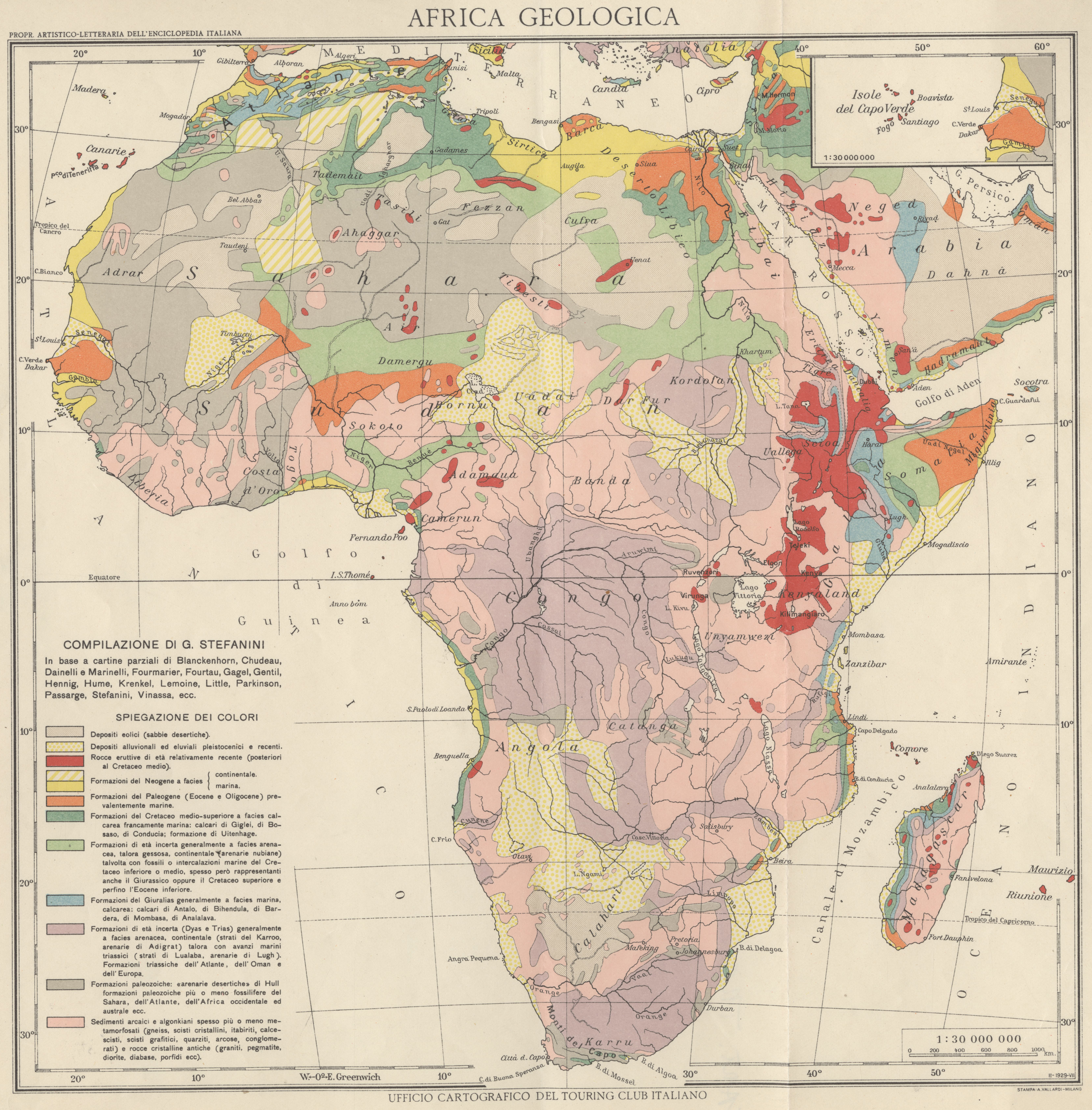
1930s geological map of Africa

== Major geological events ==
- Vredefort impact structure

== Geological features ==
- Central African Shear Zone

== Geologists of Africa ==
- Maria Wilman
- Hugo Dummett

== Geological maps ==
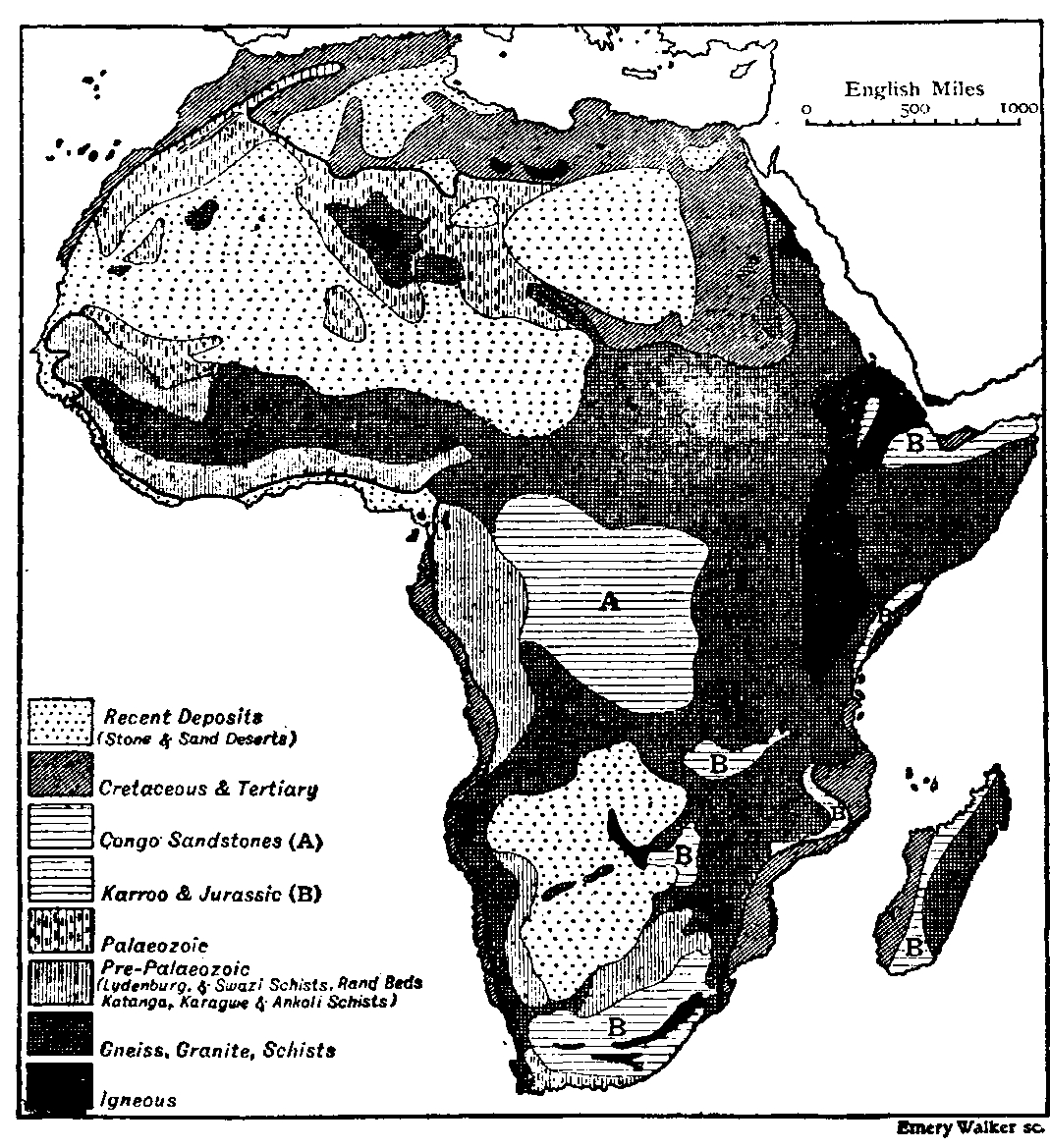
1911 geological map of Africa

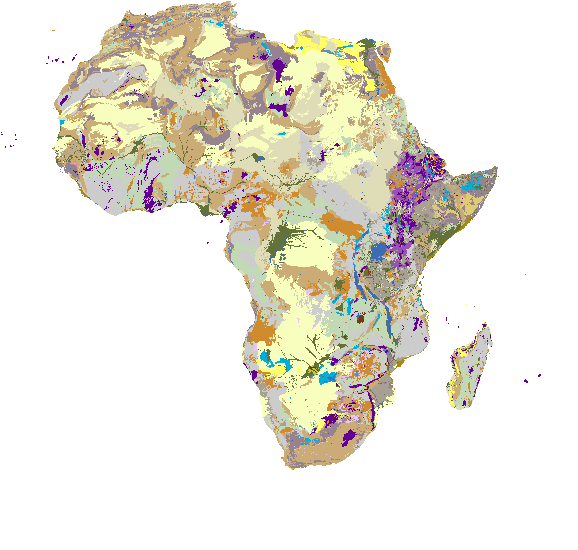
2015 surface lithology of Africa map

== See also ==
- Category: Geologic groups of Africa
- Category: Stratigraphy of Africa
