= Precambrian =

History of Earth 4600–539 million years ago

- 4567.3 ± 0.16 – 538.8 ± 0.6 Ma

Chronology
Vertical axis scale: Millions of years ago
- Proposed subdivisions: See Proposed pre-Cryogenian timeline

Etymology
- Synonym(s): Cryptozoic

Usage information
- Celestial body: Earth
- Regional usage: Global (ICS)
- Time scale(s) used: ICS Time Scale

Definition
- Chronological unit: Supereon
- Stratigraphic unit: Supereonthem
- Time span formality: Informal
- Lower boundary definition: Formation of the Earth
- Lower GSSA ratified: October 5, 2022
- Upper boundary definition: Appearance of the Ichnofossil Treptichnus pedum
- Upper boundary GSSP: Fortune Head section, Newfoundland, Canada; 47.0762°N 55.8310°W
- Upper GSSP ratified: August 1992 (as base of Cambrian)

The Precambrian ( /priˈkæmbri.ən, -ˈkeɪm-/ pree-KAM-bree-ən, -KAYM-; pre-Cambrian, or Cryptozoic, sometimes abbreviated pꞒ or PreꞒ) is the earlier part of Earth's history, before the current Phanerozoic Eon. The Precambrian is so named because it preceded the Cambrian, the first period of the Phanerozoic Eon, which is named after Cambria, the Latinized name for Wales, where rocks from this age were first studied. The Precambrian accounts for 88% of the Earth's geologic time.

The Precambrian is an informal unit of geologic time, subdivided into three eons (Hadean, Archean, Proterozoic) of the geologic time scale. It spans from the formation of Earth about 4.6 billion years ago (Ga) to the beginning of the Cambrian Period, about 538.8 million years ago (Ma), when hard-shelled creatures first appeared in abundance.

== Overview ==
Relatively little is known about the Precambrian, despite it making up roughly eight-ninths of the Earth's history, and what is known has largely been discovered from the 1960s onwards. The Precambrian fossil record is poorer than that of the succeeding Phanerozoic, and fossils from the Precambrian (e.g. stromatolites) are of limited biostratigraphic use. This is because many Precambrian rocks have been heavily metamorphosed, obscuring their origins, while others have been destroyed by erosion, or remain deeply buried beneath Phanerozoic strata.

It is thought that the Earth coalesced from material in orbit around the Sun at roughly 4,543 Ma. Shortly after Earth formed, it may have been struck by another smaller planet called Theia, splitting off material that formed the Moon (see Giant-impact hypothesis). A stable crust was apparently in place by 4,433 Ma, since zircon crystals from Western Australia have been dated at 4,404 ± 8 Ma.

The term "Precambrian" is used by geologists and paleontologists for general discussions not requiring a more specific eon name. However, both the United States Geological Survey and the International Commission on Stratigraphy regard the term as informal. Because the span of time falling under the Precambrian consists of three eons (the Hadean, the Archean, and the Proterozoic), it is sometimes described as a supereon, but this is also an informal term, not defined by the ICS in its chronostratigraphic guide.

The oldest fossils found in what was previously called Azoic rock, established the geological boundary between the Precambrian and Cambrian.

Eozoic (from eo- "earliest") was a synonym for pre-Cambrian or Precambrian, or more specifically Archean.

== Life forms ==
A specific date for the origin of life has not been determined. Carbon found in 3.8 billion-year-old rocks (Archean Eon) from islands off western Greenland may be of organic origin. Well-preserved microscopic fossils of bacteria older than 3.46 billion years have been found in Western Australia. Probable fossils 100 million years older have been found in the same area. However, there is evidence that life could have evolved over 4.280 billion years ago. There is a fairly solid record of bacterial life throughout the remainder (Proterozoic Eon) of the Precambrian.

Complex multicellular organisms may have appeared as early as 2100 Ma. However, the interpretation of ancient fossils is problematic, and "... some definitions of multicellularity encompass everything from simple bacterial colonies to badgers." Other possible early complex multicellular organisms include a possible 2450 Ma red alga from the Kola Peninsula, 1650 Ma carbonaceous biosignatures in north China, the 1600 Ma Rafatazmia, and a possible 1047 Ma Bangiomorpha red alga from the Canadian Arctic. The earliest fossils widely accepted as complex multicellular organisms date from the Ediacaran Period. A very diverse collection of soft-bodied forms is found in a variety of locations worldwide and date to between 635 and 542 Ma. These are referred to as Ediacaran or Vendian biota. Hard-shelled creatures appeared toward the end of that time span, marking the beginning of the Phanerozoic Eon. By the middle of the following Cambrian Period, a very diverse fauna is recorded in the Burgess Shale, including some which may represent stem groups of modern taxa. The increase in diversity of lifeforms during the early Cambrian is called the Cambrian explosion of life.

While land seems to have been devoid of plants and animals, cyanobacteria and other microbes formed prokaryotic mats that covered terrestrial areas.

Tracks from an animal with leg-like appendages have been found in what was mud 551 million years ago.

=== Emergence of life ===
The RNA world hypothesis asserts that RNA evolved before coded proteins and DNA genomes. During the Hadean Eon (4,567–4,031 Ma) abundant geothermal microenvironments were present that may have had the potential to support the synthesis and replication of RNA and thus possibly the evolution of a primitive life form. It was shown that porous rock systems comprising heated air-water interfaces could allow ribozyme-catalyzed RNA replication of sense and antisense strands that could be followed by strand-dissociation, thus enabling combined synthesis, release and folding of active ribozymes. This primitive RNA replicative system also may have been able to undergo template strand switching during replication (genetic recombination) as is known to occur during the RNA replication of extant coronaviruses.

== Planetary environment and the oxygen catastrophe ==
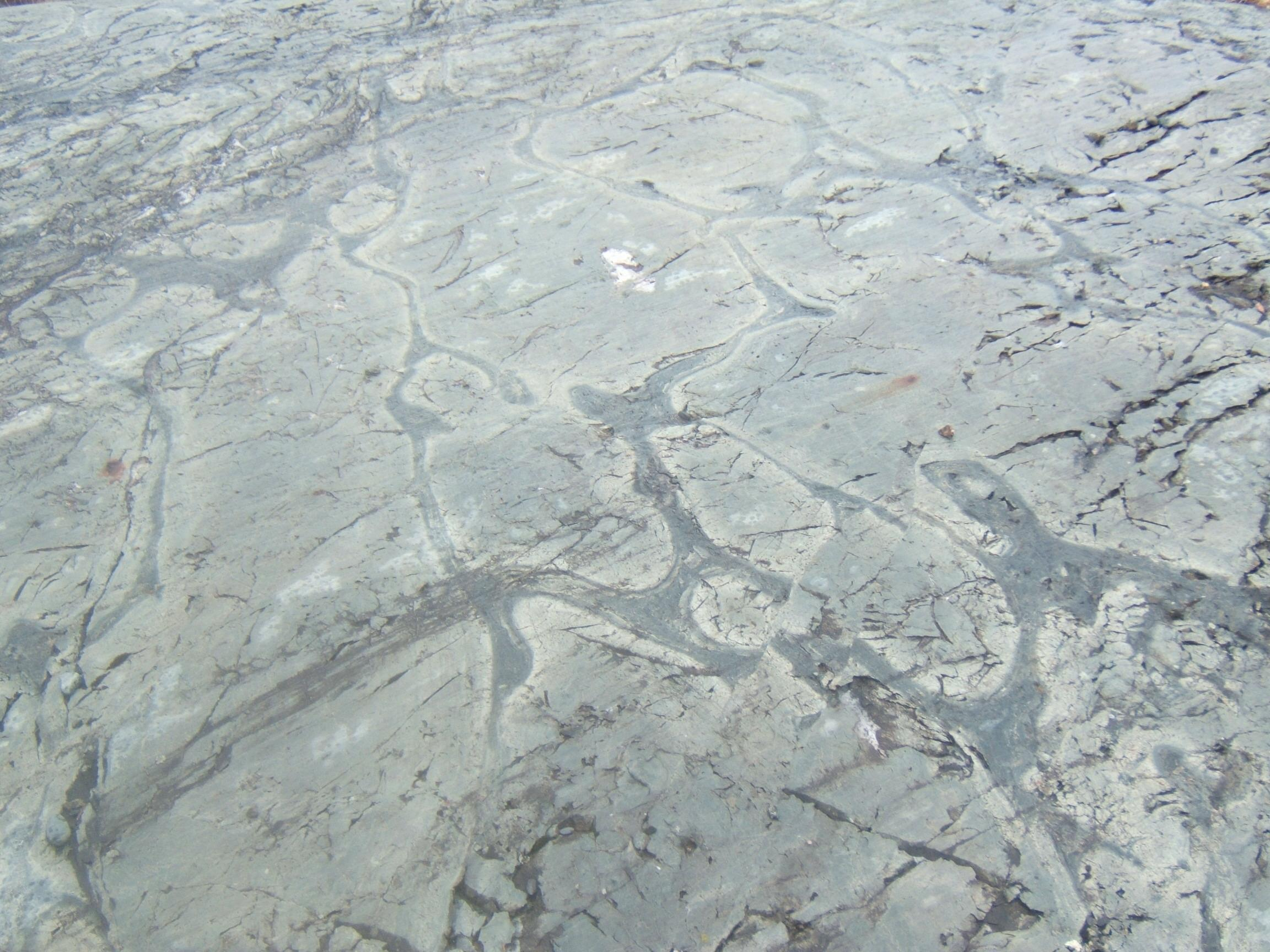
Weathered Precambrian pillow lava in the Temagami Greenstone Belt of the Canadian Shield

Evidence of the details of plate motions and other tectonic activity in the Precambrian is difficult to interpret. It is generally believed that small proto-continents existed before 4280 Ma, and that most of the Earth's landmasses collected into a single supercontinent around 1130 Ma. The supercontinent, known as Rodinia, broke up around 750 Ma. A number of glacial periods have been identified going as far back as the Huronian epoch, roughly 2400–2100 Ma. One of the best studied is the Sturtian-Varangian glaciation, around 850–635 Ma, which may have brought glacial conditions all the way to the equator, resulting in a "Snowball Earth".

It is believed that molecular oxygen was not a significant fraction of Earth's atmosphere until after photosynthetic life forms evolved and began to produce it in large quantities as a byproduct of their metabolism. This radical shift from a chemically inert to an oxidizing atmosphere caused an ecological crisis, sometimes called the oxygen catastrophe. At first, oxygen would have quickly combined with other elements in Earth's crust, primarily iron, removing it from the atmosphere. After the supply of oxidizable surfaces ran out, oxygen would have begun to accumulate in the atmosphere, and the modern high-oxygen atmosphere would have developed. Evidence for this lies in older rocks that contain massive banded iron formations that were laid down as iron oxides.

== Subdivisions ==
Life timeline
← / Earth formed; ← / Earliest water; ← / LUCA; ← / Earliest fossils; ← / Great Oxygenation Event; ← / Sexual reproduction; ← / Earliest fungi; ← / Neoproterozoic oxygenation event; ← / Ediacaran biota; ← / Cambrian explosion; ← / Earliest tetrapods; ← / Earliest hominoid
(million years ago)

A terminology has evolved covering the early years of the Earth's existence, as radiometric dating has allowed absolute dates to be assigned to specific formations and features. The Precambrian is divided into three eons: the Hadean (4567.3–4031 Ma), Archean (4031-2500 Ma) and Proterozoic (2500-538.8 Ma). See Timetable of the Precambrian.

- Proterozoic: this eon refers to the time from the lower Cambrian boundary, 538.8 Ma, back through 2500 Ma. As originally used, it was a synonym for "Precambrian" and hence included everything prior to the Cambrian boundary. The Proterozoic Eon is divided into three eras: the Neoproterozoic, Mesoproterozoic and Paleoproterozoic.
  - Neoproterozoic: The youngest geologic era of the Proterozoic Eon, from the Cambrian Period lower boundary (538.8 Ma) back to 1000 Ma. The Neoproterozoic corresponds to Precambrian Z rocks of older North American stratigraphy.
    - Ediacaran: The youngest geologic period within the Neoproterozoic Era. The "2012 Geologic Time Scale" dates it from 538.8 to 635 Ma. In this period the Ediacaran biota appeared.
    - Cryogenian: The middle period in the Neoproterozoic Era: 635-720 Ma.
    - Tonian: the earliest period of the Neoproterozoic Era: 720-1000 Ma.
  - Mesoproterozoic: the middle era of the Proterozoic Eon, 1000-1600 Ma. Corresponds to "Precambrian Y" rocks of older North American stratigraphy.
  - Paleoproterozoic: oldest era of the Proterozoic Eon, 1600-2500 Ma. Corresponds to "Precambrian X" rocks of older North American stratigraphy.
- Archean Eon: 2500-4031 Ma.
- Hadean Eon: 4031–4567.3 Ma. This term was intended originally to cover the time before any preserved rocks were deposited, although some zircon crystals from about 4400 Ma demonstrate the existence of crust in the Hadean Eon. Other records from Hadean time come from the Moon and meteorites.

It has been proposed that the Precambrian should be divided into eons and eras that reflect stages of planetary evolution, rather than the current scheme based upon numerical ages. Such a system could rely on events in the stratigraphic record and be demarcated by GSSPs. The Precambrian could be divided into five "natural" eons, characterized as follows:

1. Accretion and differentiation: a period of planetary formation until giant Moon-forming impact event.
2. Hadean: dominated by heavy bombardment from about 4.51 Ga (possibly including a cool early Earth period) to the end of the Late Heavy Bombardment period.
3. Archean: a period defined by the first crustal formations (the Isua greenstone belt) until the deposition of banded iron formations due to increasing atmospheric oxygen content.
4. Transition: a period of continued banded iron formation until the first continental red beds.
5. Proterozoic: a period of modern plate tectonics until the first animals.

== Precambrian supercontinents ==
The movement of Earth's plates has caused the formation and break-up of continents over time, including occasional formation of a supercontinent containing most or all of the landmass. The earliest known supercontinent was Vaalbara. It formed from proto-continents and was a supercontinent 3.636 billion years ago. Vaalbara broke up c. 2.845–2.803 Ga ago. The supercontinent Kenorland was formed c. 2.72 Ga ago and then broke sometime after 2.45–2.1 Ga into the proto-continent cratons called Laurentia, Baltica, Yilgarn craton and Kalahari. The supercontinent Columbia, or Nuna, formed 2.1–1.8 billion years ago and broke up about 1.3–1.2 billion years ago. The supercontinent Rodinia is thought to have formed about 1300-900 Ma, to have included most or all of Earth's continents and to have broken up into eight continents around 750–600 million years ago.

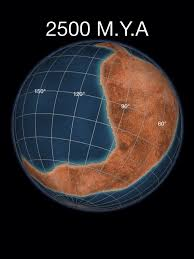
A conceptual map of Kenorland supercontinent 2.5 billion years ago

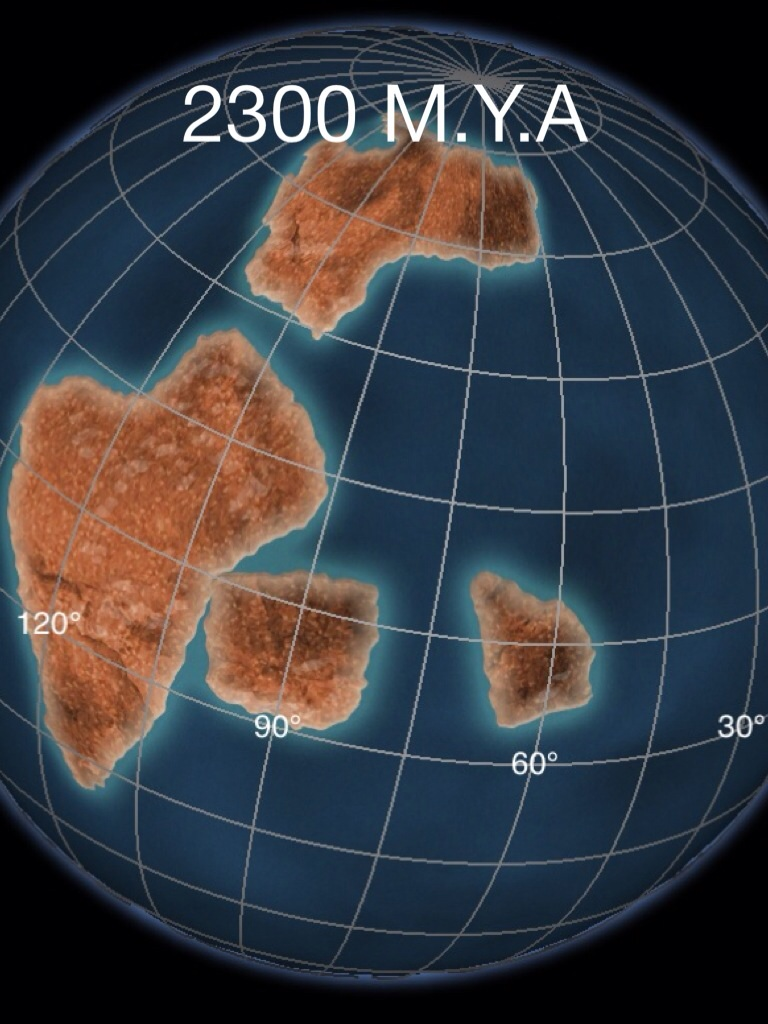
A conceptual map of Kenorland breaking up 2.3 billion years ago

The supercontinent Columbia about 1.6 billion years ago

Rodinia

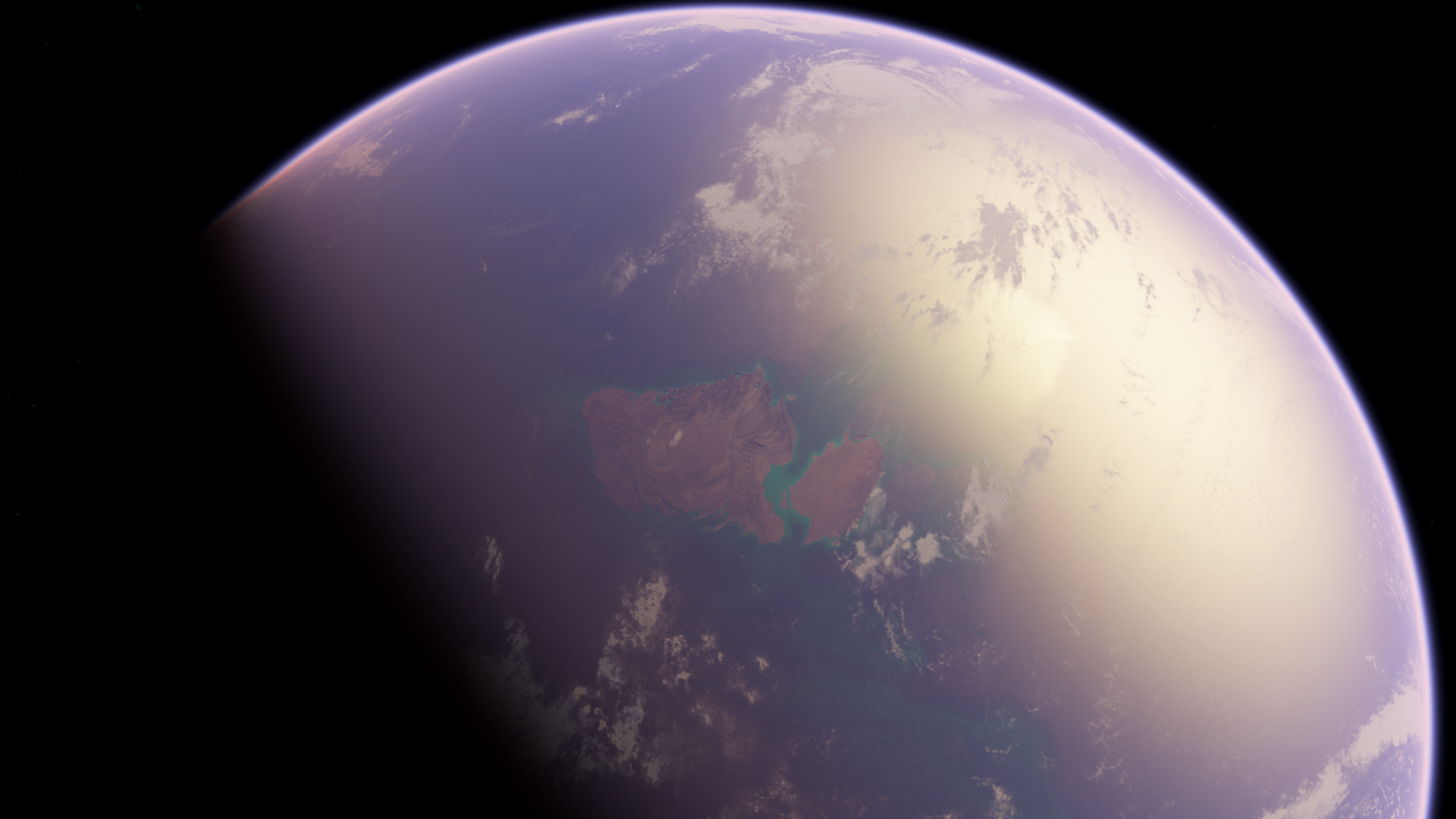
An artist impression of Vaalbara

== See also ==
- Phanerozoic – Fourth and current eon of the geological timescale
  - Paleozoic – First era of the Phanerozoic Eon
  - Mesozoic – Second era of the Phanerozoic Eon
  - Cenozoic – Third and current era of the Phanerozoic Eon
- Precambrian Research – Scientific journal established in 1974
