= Spilite =

Fine-grained igneous rock, resulting from alteration of oceanic basalt

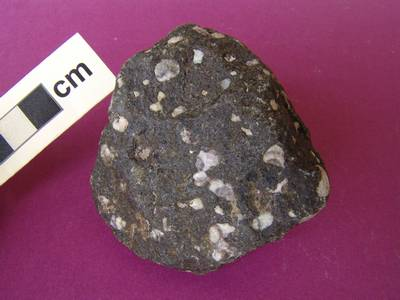
Spilite

Spilite (from Greek: σπιλάς) is a fine-grained igneous rock, resulting particularly from alteration of oceanic basalt.

The term was introduced into the geological literature by Alexandre Brongniart in 1827. Spilite is formed when basaltic lava reacts with seawater, or from hydrothermal alteration when seawater circulates through hot volcanic rocks.

It is a metasomatic rock with a microscopic or very-fine grain size produced by hydrothermal alteration of basalt, and composed of albite or oligoclase, together with chlorite, epidote, calcite, and actinolite. Spilite is veined by calcite or chalcedony, and vesicles and cavities are filled with secondary minerals. It is generally classed with basalts, and it often retains many textural and structural features characteristic of basalt.

== See also ==
- Pillow lava – Lava containing characteristic pillow-shaped structures due to subaqueous extrusion
