= Keratophyre =

Igneous rock

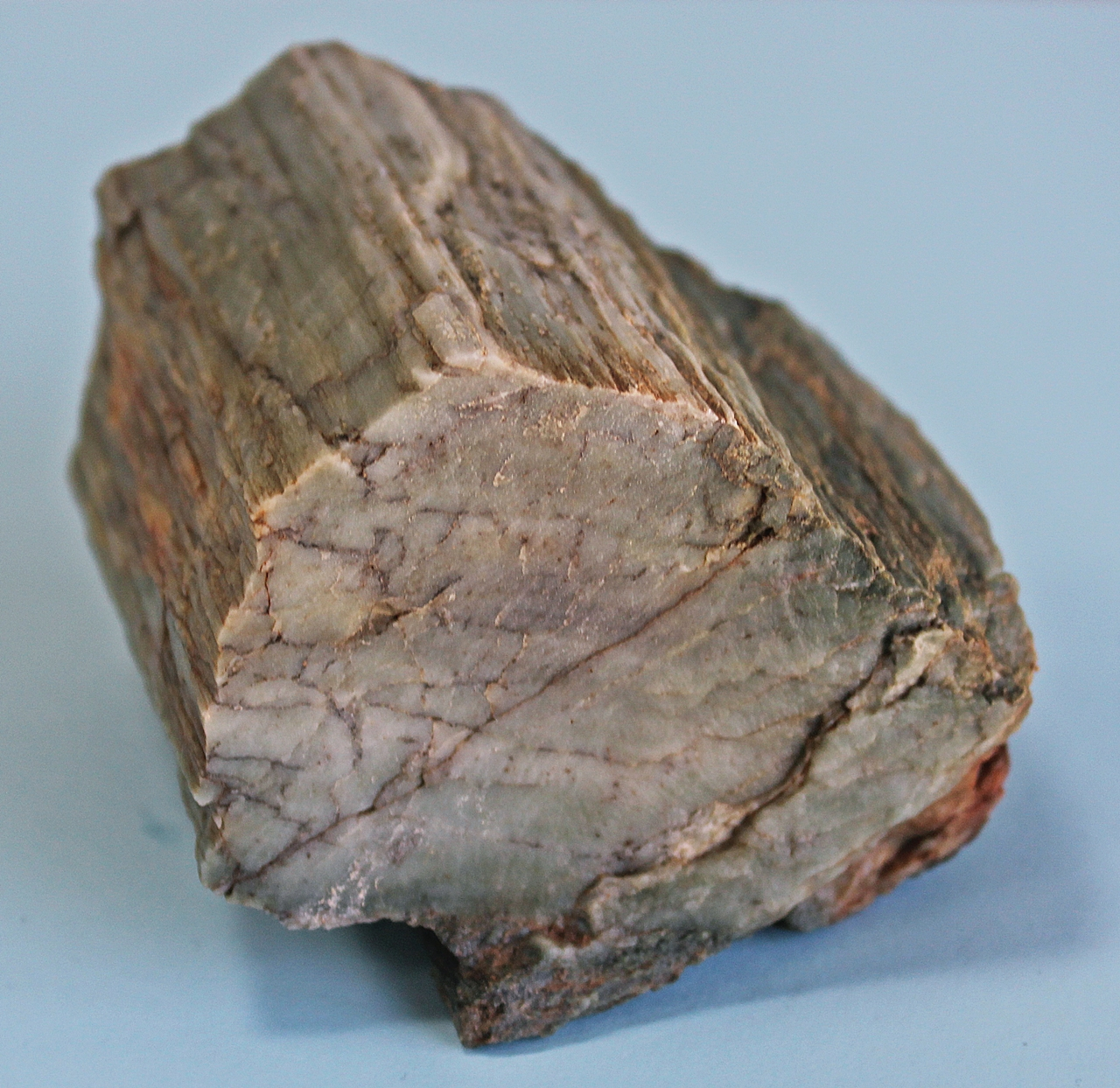
Keratophyre from the Neoproterozoic Hatat Formation, Oman

Keratophyre is a volcanic rock of intermediate composition. Although similar to trachyte, keratophyre's plagioclase component is richer in sodium than the plagioclase found in trachyte. Keratophyre forms lava flows and subvolcanic intrusions (dykes and sills). Keratophyre occurs, for example, at Hüttenrode in the Harz Mountains of Germany and in the Berwyn Hills of Wales. Keratophyre tuff of Early Devonian age occurs in Sauerland (Germany).

The term quartz keratophyre has traditionally been used in the Nordic countries to describe a metamorphosed, felsic extrusive rock, corresponding to rhyolite, dacite, or rhyodacite according to IUGS terminology.
