= Earliest known life forms =

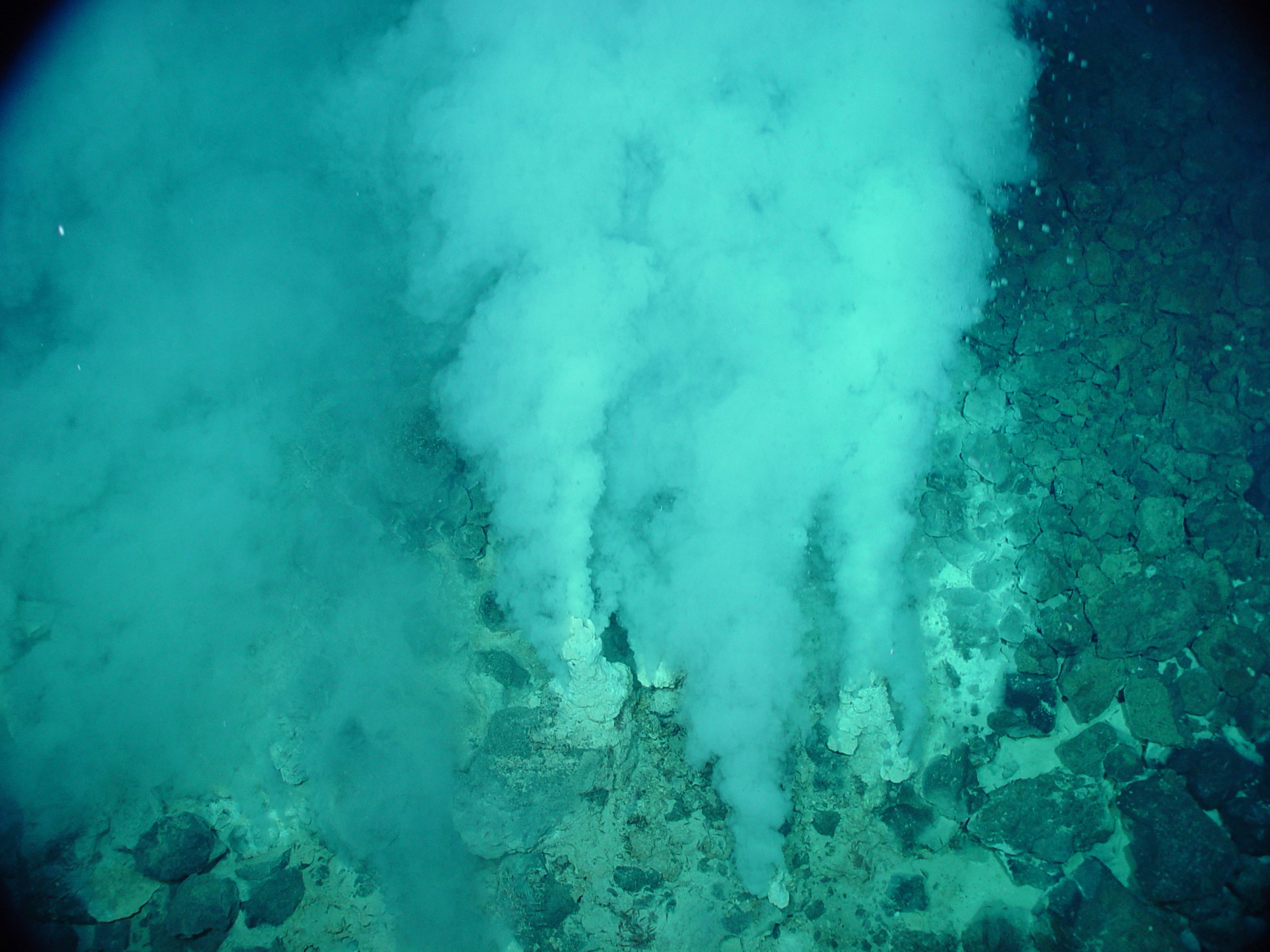
Evidence of possibly the oldest forms of life on Earth has been found in hydrothermal vent precipitates.

Life timeline
← / Earth formed; ← / Earliest water; ← / LUCA; ← / Earliest fossils; ← / Great Oxygenation Event; ← / Sexual reproduction; ← / Earliest fungi; ← / Neoproterozoic oxygenation event; ← / Ediacaran biota; ← / Cambrian explosion; ← / Earliest tetrapods; ← / Earliest hominoid
(million years ago)

The earliest known life forms on Earth may be as old as 4.3 billion years (or Ga) according to possible microfossils found in the Nuvvuagittuq belt in Quebec, Canada. It could also be 4.1 billion Ga according to biologically fractionated graphite inside a single zircon grain in the Jack Hills range of Australia. The earliest evidence of life found in a stratigraphic unit, not just a single mineral grain, is the 3.7 Ga metasedimentary rocks containing graphite from the Isua Supracrustal Belt in Greenland. The earliest, directly known life on Earth are stromatolite fossils which have been found in 3.480-billion-year-old geyserite uncovered in the Dresser Formation of the Pilbara Craton of Western Australia. Various microfossils of microorganisms have been found in 3.4 Ga rocks, including 3.465-billion-year-old Apex chert rocks from the same Australian craton region, and in 3.42 Ga hydrothermal vent precipitates from Barberton, South Africa. Much later in the geologic record, likely starting in 1.73 Ga, preserved molecular compounds of biologic origin are indicative of aerobic life. Therefore, the earliest time for the origin of life on Earth is at least 3.5 billion years ago and possibly as early as 4.1 billion years ago—not long after the oceans formed 4.5 billion years ago and after the formation of the Earth 4.54 billion years ago.

== Biospheres ==
Earth is the only place in the universe known to harbor life, where it exists in myriad environments. Since its emergence, life has persisted in several geological environments. The Earth's biosphere extends down to at least 10 km (6.2 mi) below the seafloor, up to 41–77 km (25–48 mi) into the atmosphere, and includes soil, hydrothermal vents, and rock. Further, the biosphere has been found to extend at least 914.4 m (3,000 ft; 0.5682 mi) below the ice of Antarctica and includes the deepest parts of the ocean. In July 2020, marine biologists reported that aerobic microorganisms (mainly) in "quasi-suspended animation" were found in organically poor sediment 76.2 m (250 ft) below the seafloor in the South Pacific Gyre (SPG) ("the deadest spot in the ocean"). Microbes have been found in the Atacama Desert in Chile, one of the driest places on Earth. In February 2023, findings of a "dark microbiome" of microbial dark matter of unfamiliar microorganisms in the Atacama Desert were reported. Microbes have also been found in deep-sea hydrothermal vent environments which can reach temperatures over 400 °C. Microbial communities can also survive in cold permafrost conditions down to -25 °C. Under certain test conditions, life forms have been observed to survive in the vacuum of outer space. More recently, studies conducted on the International Space Station found that bacteria could survive in outer space.

== Geochemical evidence ==
The age of Earth is about 4.54 billion years; the earliest undisputed evidence of life on Earth dates from at least 3.5 billion years ago according to the stromatolite record. Some computer models suggest life began as early as 4.5 billion years ago. The oldest evidence of life is indirect in the form of isotopic fractionation processes. Microorganisms will preferentially use the lighter isotope of an atom to build biomass, as it takes less energy to break the bonds for metabolic processes. Biologic material will often have a composition that is enriched in lighter isotopes compared to the surrounding rock it's found in. Carbon isotopes, expressed scientifically in parts per thousand difference from a standard as δ^{13}C, are frequently used to detect carbon fixation by organisms and assess if purported early life evidence has biological origins. Typically, life will preferentially metabolize the isotopically light ^{12}C isotope instead of the heavier ^{13}C isotope. Biologic material can record this fractionation of carbon.

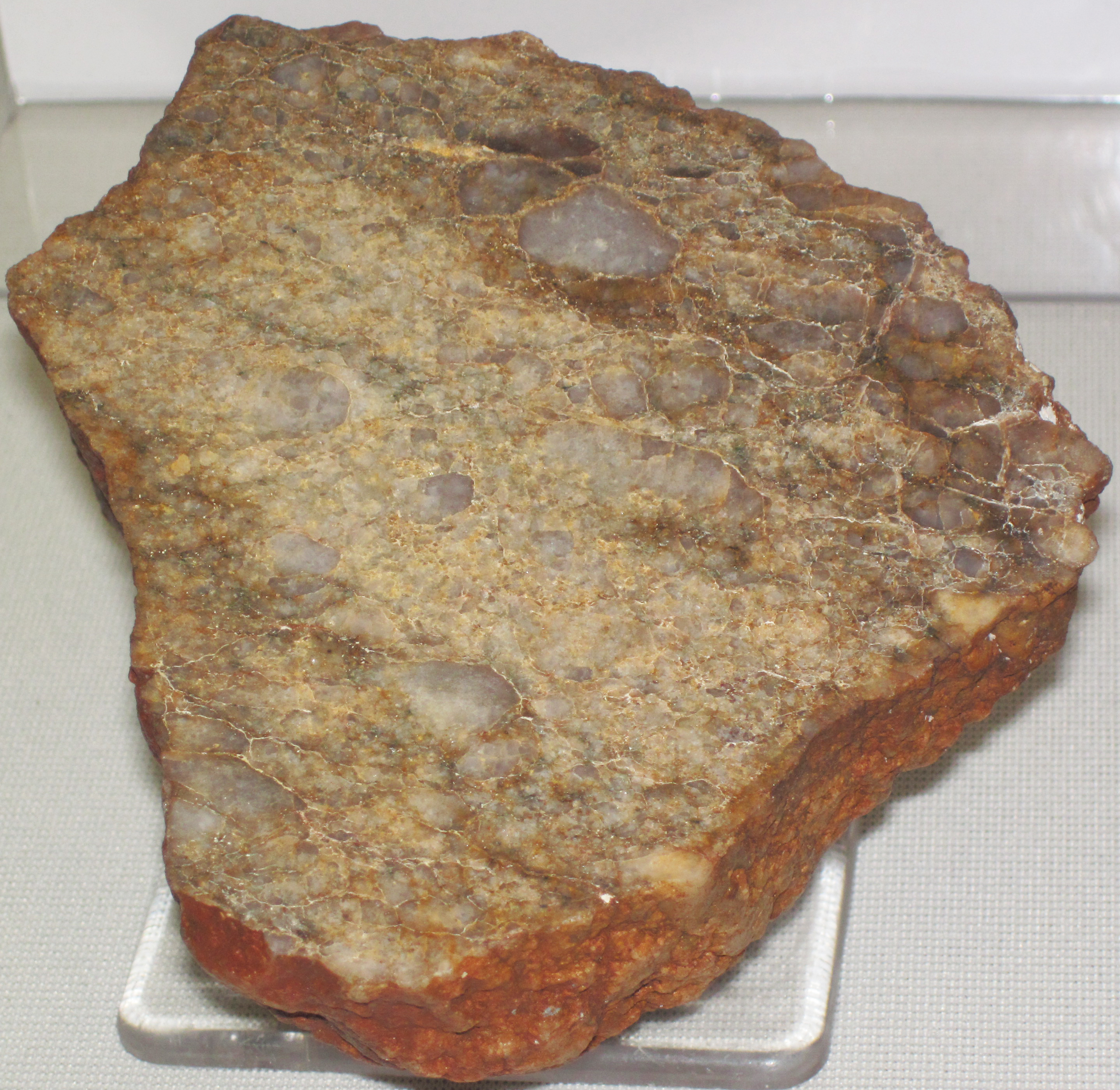
Zircons in metaconglomerates from the Jack Hills in Australia show carbon isotopic evidence for early life.

The oldest disputed geochemical evidence of life is isotopically light graphite inside a single zircon grain from the Jack Hills in Western Australia. The graphite showed a δ^{13}C signature consistent with biogenic carbon on Earth. Other early evidence of life is found in rocks both from the Akilia Sequence and the Isua Supracrustal Belt (ISB) in Greenland. These 3.7 Ga metasedimentary rocks also contain graphite or graphite inclusions with carbon isotope signatures that suggest biological fractionation.

The primary issue with isotopic evidence of life is that abiotic processes can fractionate isotopes and produce similar signatures to biotic processes. Reassessment of the Akilia graphite show that metamorphism, Fischer-Tropsch mechanisms in hydrothermal environments, and volcanic processes may be responsible for enrichment lighter carbon isotopes. The ISB rocks that contain the graphite may have experienced a change in composition from hot fluids, i.e., metasomatism, thus the graphite may have been formed by abiotic chemical reactions. However, the ISB's graphite is generally more accepted as biologic in origin after further spectral analysis.

Metasedimentary rocks from the 3.5 Ga Dresser Formation, which experienced less metamorphism than the sequences in Greenland, contain better preserved geochemical evidence. Carbon isotopes as well as sulfur isotopes found in barite, which are fractionated by microbial metabolisms during sulfate reduction, are consistent with biological processes. However, the Dresser formation was deposited in an active volcanic and hydrothermal environment, and abiotic processes could still be responsible for these fractionations. Many of these findings are supplemented by direct evidence, typically by the presence of microfossils, however.

== Fossil evidence ==
Fossils are direct evidence of life. In the search for the earliest life, fossils are often supplemented by geochemical evidence. The fossil record does not extend as far back as the geochemical record due to metamorphic processes that erase fossils from geologic units.

=== Stromatolites ===
Stromatolites are laminated sedimentary structures created by photosynthetic organisms as they establish a microbial mat on a sediment surface. An important distinction for biogenicity is their convex-up structures and wavy laminations, which are typical of microbial communities who build preferentially toward the sun. A disputed report of stromatolites is from the 3.7 Ga Isua metasediments that show convex-up, conical, and domical morphologies. Further mineralogical analysis disagrees with the initial findings of internal convex-up laminae, a critical criterion for stromatolite identification, suggesting that the structures may be deformation features (i.e. boudins) caused by extensional tectonics in the Isua Supracrustal Belt.

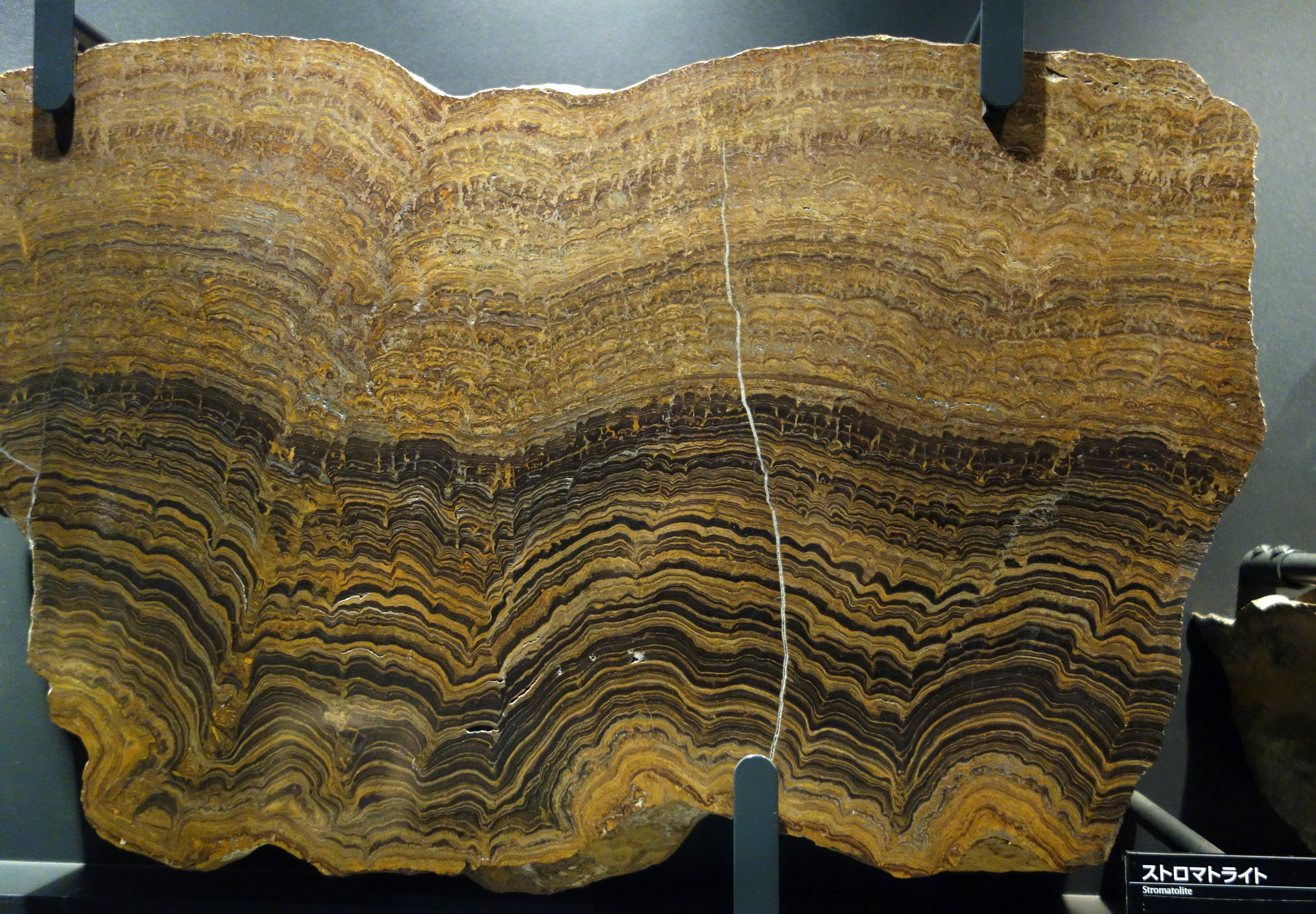
Stromatolite fossil showing convex-up structures.

The earliest direct evidence of life are stromatolites found in 3.48 billion-year-old chert in the Dresser formation of the Pilbara Craton in Western Australia. Several features in these fossils are difficult to explain with abiotic processes, for example, the thickening of laminae over flexure crests that is expected from more sunlight. Sulfur isotopes from barite veins in the stromatolites also favor a biologic origin. However, while most scientists accept their biogenicity, abiotic explanations for these fossils cannot be fully discarded due to their hydrothermal depositional environment and debated geochemical evidence.

Most archean stromatolites older than 3.0 Ga are found in Australia or South Africa. Stratiform stromatolites from the Pilbara Craton have been identified in the 3.47 Ga Mount Ada Basalt. Barberton, South Africa hosts stratiform stromatolites in the 3.46 Hooggenoeg, 3.42 Kromberg and 3.33 Ga Mendon Formations of the Onverwacht Group. The 3.43 Ga Strelley Pool Formation in Western Australia hosts stromatolites that demonstrate vertical and horizontal changes that may demonstrate microbial communities responding to transient environmental conditions. Thus, it is likely that anoxygenic or oxygenic photosynthesis has been occurring since at least 3.43 Ga based on evidence from the Strelley Pool Formation.

=== Microfossils ===
Claims of the earliest life using fossilized microorganisms (microfossils) are from hydrothermal vent precipitates from an ancient sea-bed in the Nuvvuagittuq Belt of Quebec, Canada. These may be as old as 4.28 billion years, which would make it the oldest evidence of life on Earth, suggesting "an almost instantaneous emergence of life" after ocean formation 4.41 billion years ago. These findings may be better explained by abiotic processes: for example, silica-rich waters, "chemical gardens," circulating hydrothermal fluids, and volcanic ejecta can produce morphologies similar to those presented in Nuvvuagittuq.

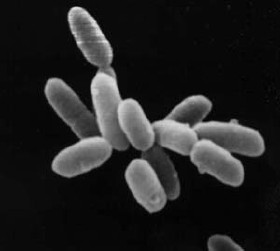
Archaea (prokaryotic microbes) were first found in extreme environments, such as hydrothermal vents.

The 3.48 Ga Dresser formation hosts microfossils of prokaryotic filaments in silica veins, the earliest fossil evidence of life on Earth, but their origins may be volcanic. 3.465-billion-year-old Australian Apex chert rocks may once have contained microorganisms, although the validity of these findings has been contested. "Putative filamentous microfossils," possibly of methanogens and/or methanotrophs that lived about 3.42-billion-year-old in "a paleo-subseafloor hydrothermal vein system of the Barberton greenstone belt, have been identified in South Africa." A diverse set of microfossil morphologies have been found in the 3.43 Ga Strelley Pool Formation including spheroid, lenticular, and film-like microstructures. Their biogenicity are strengthened by their observed chemical preservation. The early lithification of these structures allowed important chemical tracers, such as the carbon-to-nitrogen ratio, to be retained at levels higher than is typical in older, metamorphosed rock units.

=== Molecular biomarkers ===
Biomarkers are compounds of biologic origin found in the geologic record that can be linked to past life. Although they aren't preserved until the late Archean, they are important indicators of early photosynthetic life. Lipids are particularly useful biomarkers because they can survive for long periods of geologic time and reconstruct past environments.

Lipids are commonly used in geologic studies to find evidence of oxygenic photosynthesis.

Fossilized lipids were reported from 2.7 Ga laminated shales from the Pilbara Craton and the 2.67 Ga Kaapvaal craton in South Africa. However, the age of these biomarkers and whether their deposition was synchronous with their host rocks were debated, and further work showed that the lipids were contaminants. The oldest "clearly indigenous" biomarkers are from the 1.64 Ga Barney Creek Formation in the McArthur Basin in Northern Australia, but hydrocarbons from the 1.73 Ga Wollogorang Formation in the same basin have also been detected.

Other indigenous biomarkers can be dated to the Mesoproterozoic era (1.6–1.0 Ga). The 1.4 Ga Hongshuizhuang Formation in the North China Craton contains hydrocarbons in shales that were likely sourced from prokaryotes. Biomarkers were found in siltstones from the 1.38 Ga Roper Group of the McArthur Basin. Hydrocarbons possibly derived from bacteria and algae were reported in 1.37 Ga Xiamaling Formation of the NCC. The 1.1 Ga Atar/El Mreïti Group in the Taoudeni Basin, Mauritania show indigenous biomarkers in black shales.

== Genomic evidence ==
By comparing the genomes of modern organisms (in the domains Bacteria and Archaea), it is evident that there was a last universal common ancestor (LUCA). Another term for the LUCA is the cenancestor and can be viewed as a population of organisms rather than a single entity. LUCA is not thought to be the first life on Earth, but rather the only type of organism of its time to still have living descendants. In 2016, M. C. Weiss and colleagues proposed a minimal set of genes that each occurred in at least two groups of Bacteria and two groups of Archaea. They argued that such a distribution of genes would be unlikely to arise by horizontal gene transfer, and so any such genes must have derived from the LUCA. A molecular clock model suggests that the LUCA may have lived 4.477–4.519 billion years ago, within the Hadean eon.

== RNA replicators ==
Model Hadean-like geothermal microenvironments were demonstrated to have the potential to support the synthesis and replication of RNA and thus possibly the evolution of primitive life. Porous rock systems, comprising heated air-water interfaces, were shown to facilitate ribozyme catalyzed RNA replication of sense and antisense strands and then subsequent strand-dissociation. This enabled combined synthesis, release and folding of active ribozymes.

== Hypotheses for the origin of life on Earth ==
=== Extraterrestrial origin for early life ===
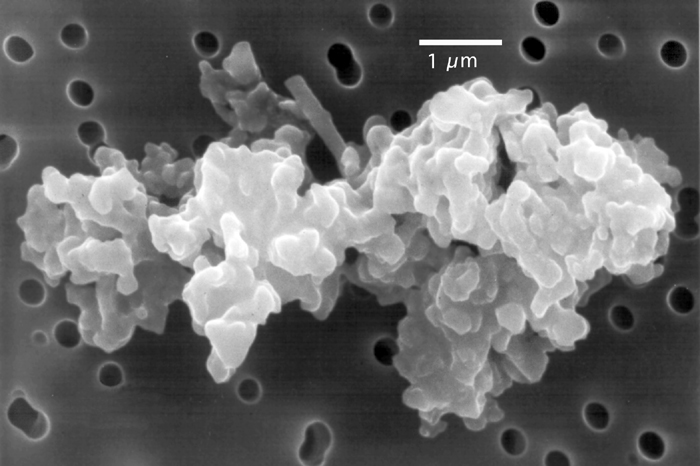
The theory of panspermia speculates that life on Earth may have come from biological matter carried by space dust or meteorites.

While current geochemical evidence dates the origin of life to possibly as early as 4.1 Ga, and fossil evidence shows life at 3.5 Ga, some researchers speculate that life may have started nearly 4.5 billion years ago. According to biologist Stephen Blair Hedges, "If life arose relatively quickly on Earth ... then it could be common in the universe." The possibility that terrestrial life forms may have been seeded from outer space has been considered. In January 2018, a study found that 4.5 billion-year-old meteorites found on Earth contained liquid water along with prebiotic complex organic substances that may be ingredients for life.

=== Hydrothermal vents ===
Hydrothermal vents have long been hypothesized to be the grounds from which life originated. The properties of ancient hydrothermal vents, such as the geochemistry, pressure, and temperatures, have the potential to create organic molecules from inorganic molecules. In experiments performed by NASA, it was shown that the organic compounds formate and methane could be created from inorganics in the conditions of ancient hydrothermal vents. The production of organic molecules could have led to the formation of more complex organic molecules, such as amino acids that can eventually form RNA or DNA.

=== Darwin's hypothesis ===
Charles Darwin is well-known for his theory of evolution via natural selection. His theory for the origin of life was a "warm little pond" that harbored necessary elements for the creation of life such as "ammonia and phosphoric salts, lights, heat, electricity ... so that a protein compound was chemically formed ready to undergo still more complex changes." However, he mentioned that such an environment today would likely have been destroyed faster than it would take to form life. With this, Darwin's ideas are generally regarded as the spontaneous generation hypothesis.

=== Oparin–Haldane hypothesis ===
In 1924, Alexander Oparin suggested that the early atmosphere on Earth was full of reducing components such as ammonia, methane, water vapor, and hydrogen gas. This was proposed after atmospheric methane was discovered on other planets. Later, in 1929, J. B. S. Haldane published an article that proposed the same conditions for early life on Earth as Oparin suggested. Their hypothesis was later supported by the Miller–Urey experiment.

=== Miller–Urey experiment ===
Schematic of the Miller–Urey experiment.

At the University of Chicago in 1953, a graduate student named Stanley Miller carried out an experiment under his professor, Harold Urey. The method would allow for reducing gases to simulate the atmosphere early on Earth and a spark to simulate lightning. There was a reflux apparatus that would heat water and mix into the atmosphere where it would then cool and run into the "primordial ocean". The gases that were used to mimic the reducing atmosphere were methane, ammonia, water vapor, and hydrogen gas. Within a day of allowing the apparatus to run, the experiment yielded a "brown sludge" which was later tested and found to include the following amino acids: glycine, alanine, aspartic acid, and aminobutyric acid. In the following years, many scientists attempted to replicate the results of the experiment, which is now known as a fundamental approach to the study of abiogenesis. The Miller–Urey experiment was able to simulate the early conditions of Earth's atmosphere and produced essential amino acids that likely contributed to the production of life.

=== Clay hypothesis ===
Cairns-Smith first introduced this hypothesis in 1966, where they proposed that any crystallization process is likely to involve a basic biological evolution. Hartman then added on to this hypothesis by proposing in 1975 that metabolism could have developed from a simple environment such as clays. Clays have the ability to synthesize monomers such as amino acids, nucleotides, and other building blocks and polymerize them to create macromolecules. This makes it possible for nucleic acids like RNA or DNA to be created from clay, and cells could further evolve from there.

== Gallery ==
Earliest known life forms

Life timeline
← / Earth formed; ← / Earliest water; ← / LUCA; ← / Earliest fossils; ← / Great Oxygenation Event; ← / Sexual reproduction; ← / Earliest fungi; ← / Neoproterozoic oxygenation event; ← / Ediacaran biota; ← / Cambrian explosion; ← / Earliest tetrapods; ← / Earliest hominoid
(million years ago)

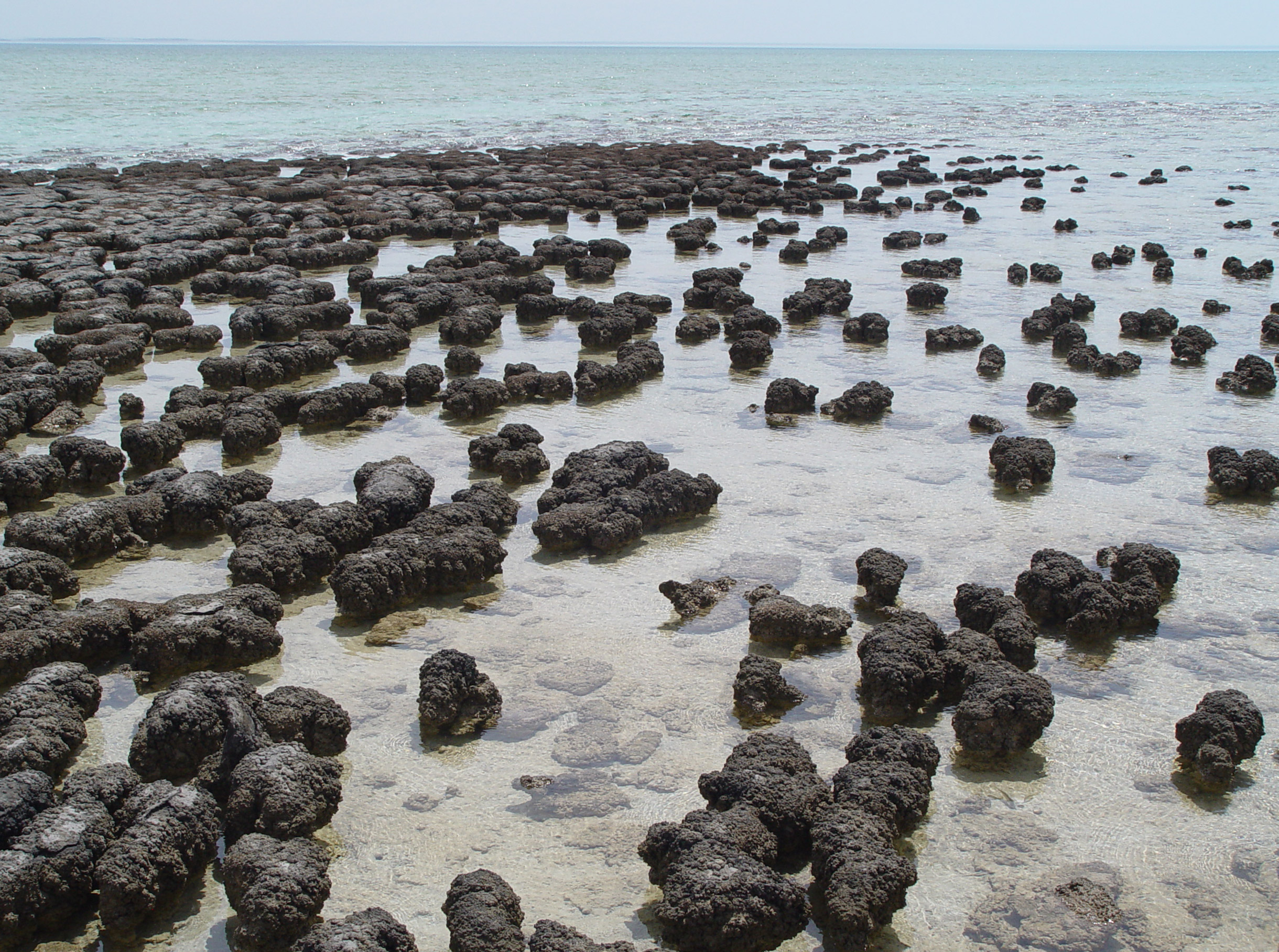
Stromatolites may have been made by microbes moving upward to avoid being smothered by sediment.

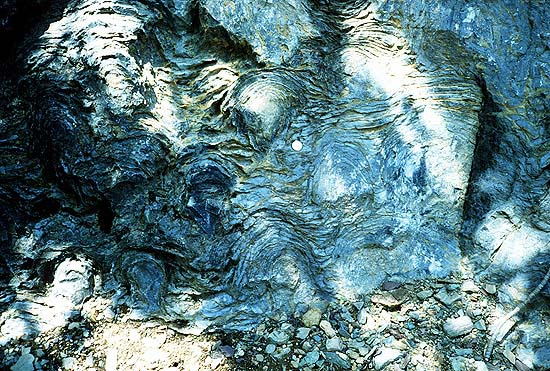
Stromatolites left behind by cyanobacteria are one of the oldest fossils of life on Earth.

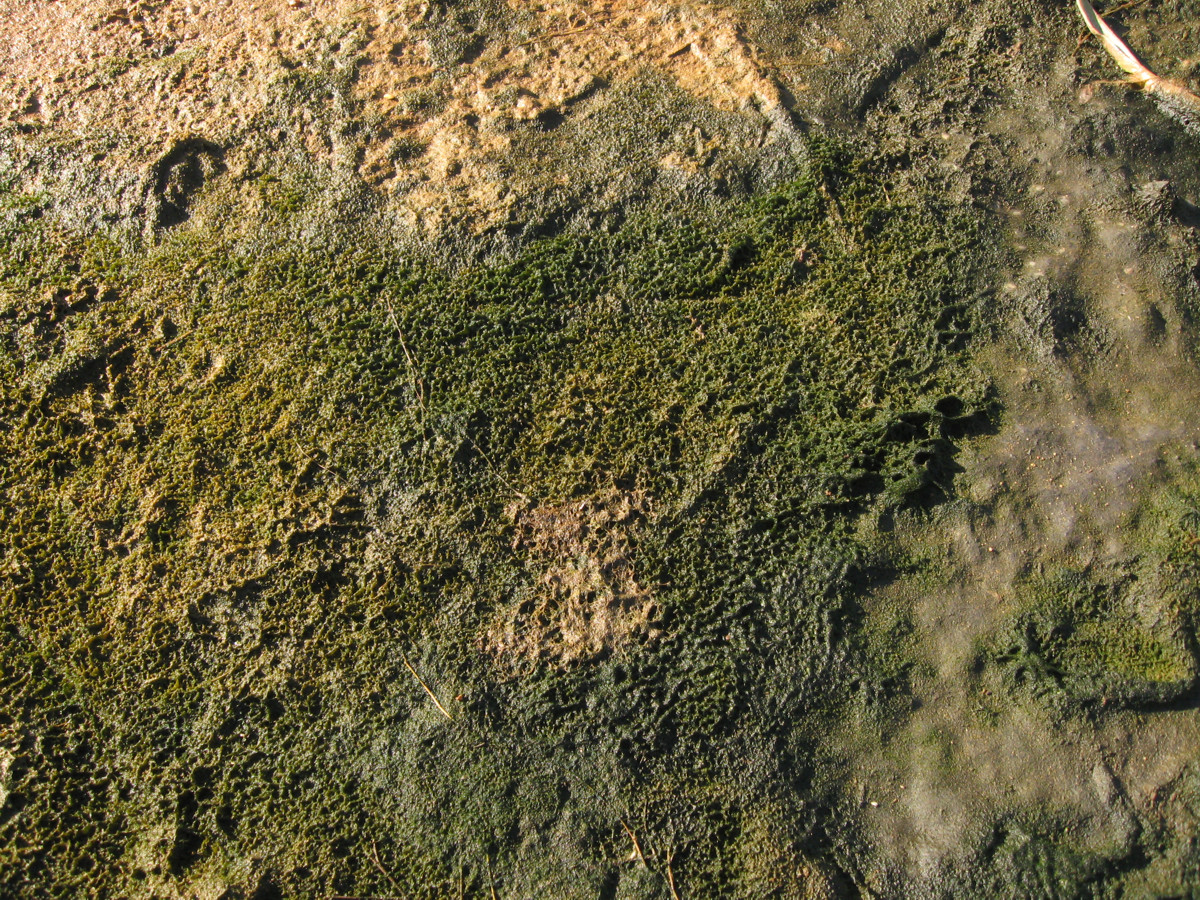
The cyanobacterial-algal mat, salty lake on the White Sea seaside
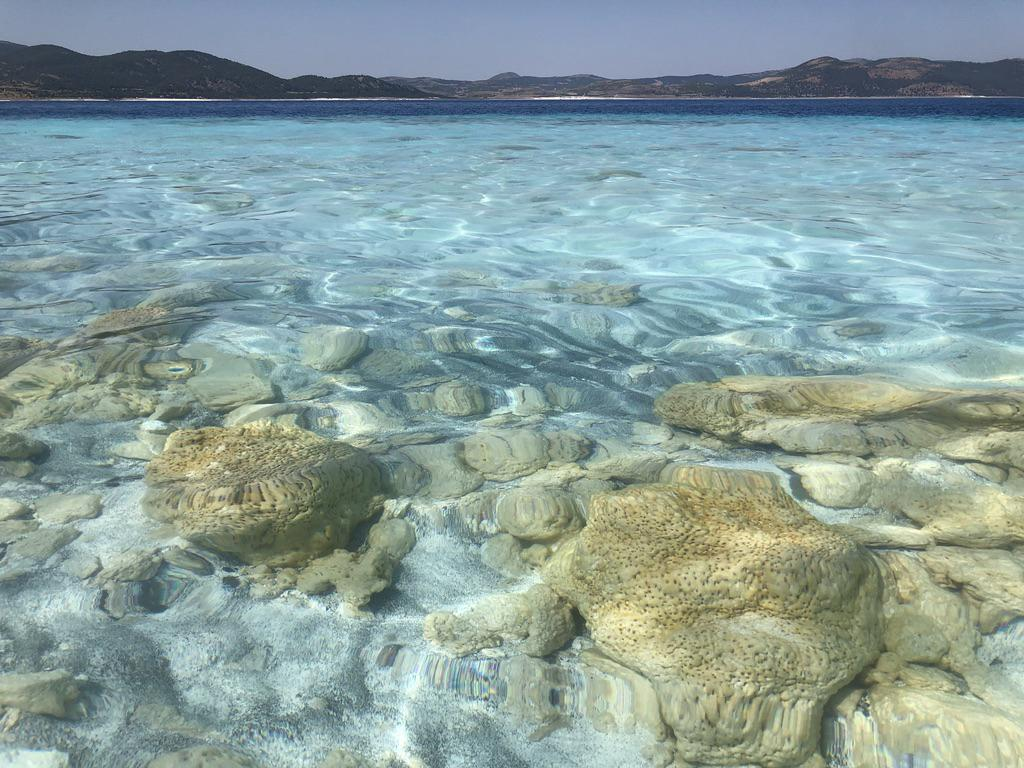
Microbialites in the Lake Salda rocks of Turkey

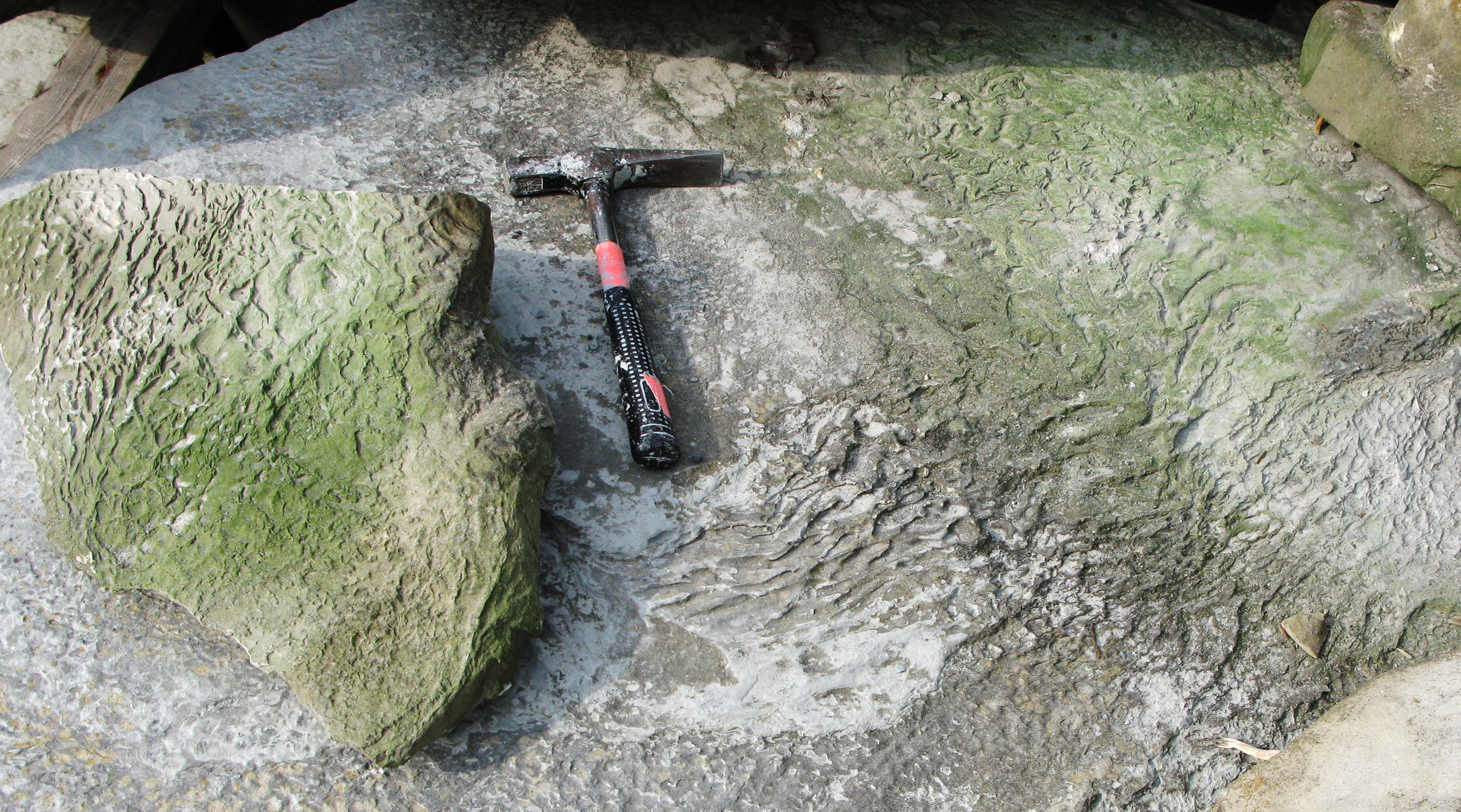
Wrinkled Kinneyia-type sedimentary structures formed beneath cohesive microbial mats in peritidal zones.

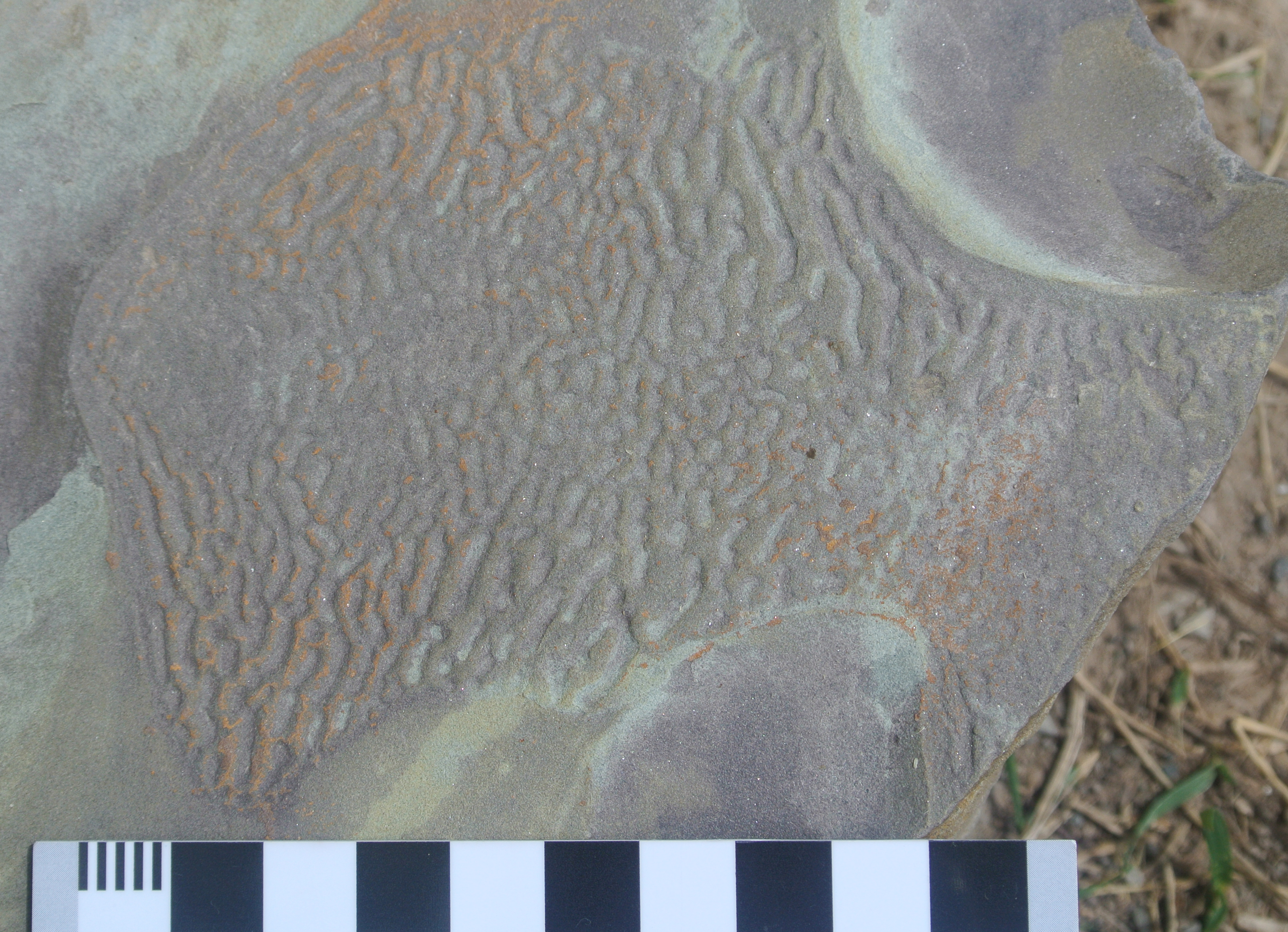
Kinneyia-like structure in the Grimsby Formation (Silurian) exposed in Niagara Gorge, NY

== See also ==
- Abiogenesis
- Creation myth
- Extremophile
- First universal common ancestor
- Hypothetical types of biochemistry
- List of longest-living organisms
- Oldest dated rocks
- Outline of biology
- Outline of life forms
- Timeline of the evolutionary history of life
- Viroid
- Virus
