= Medina Group =

- Stratigraphic range: Silurian
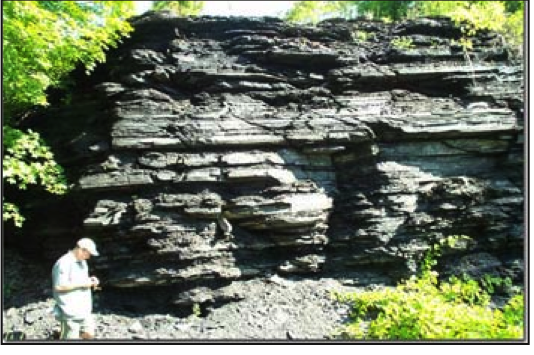
- Outcrop of the Medina Group in Upstate New York
- Type: Group
- Sub-units: Whirlpool Sandstone; Power Glen Shale; Devils Hole Sandstone; Grimsby Formation; Thorold Sandstone; Cambria Shale; Kodak Sandstone

Location
- Region: New York
- Country: United States

The Medina Group or Cataract Group is a geologic group in New York. It dates to the Silurian period. The group includes the Whirlpool Sandstone, Power Glen Shale, Devils Hole Sandstone, Grimsby Formation, Thorold Sandstone, Cambria Shale, Cabot Head Shale and Kodak Sandstone.
