= Power Glen Shale =

Geologic formation in New York, United States

- Stratigraphic range: Silurian
- Type: Formation
- Unit of: Medina Group
- Underlies: Devils Hole Sandstone
- Overlies: Whirlpool Sandstone

Lithology
- Primary: shale

Location
- Region: New York
- Country: United States

The Power Glen Shale is a geologic formation in New York. It preserves fossils dating back to the Silurian period.

== See also ==
- List of fossiliferous stratigraphic units in New York
