= Timeline of life =

Life timeline
← / Earth formed; ← / Earliest water; ← / LUCA; ← / Earliest fossils; ← / Great Oxygenation Event; ← / Sexual reproduction; ← / Earliest fungi; ← / Neoproterozoic oxygenation event; ← / Ediacaran biota; ← / Cambrian explosion; ← / Earliest tetrapods; ← / Earliest hominoid
(million years ago)

The timeline of life represents the current scientific theory outlining the major events during the development of life on Earth. Dates in this article are consensus estimates based on scientific evidence, mainly fossils.

In biology, evolution is any change across successive generations in the heritable characteristics of biological populations. Evolutionary processes give rise to diversity at every level of biological organization, from kingdoms to species, and individual organisms and molecules, such as DNA and proteins. The similarities between all present day organisms imply a common ancestor from which all known species, living and extinct, have diverged. More than 99 percent of all species that ever lived (over five billion) are estimated to be extinct. Estimates on the number of Earth's current species range from 10 million to 14 million, with about 1.2 million or 14% documented, the rest not yet described. However, a 2016 report estimates an additional 1 trillion microbial species, with only 0.001% described.

There has been controversy between more traditional views of steadily increasing biodiversity, and a newer view of cycles of annihilation and diversification, so that certain past times, such as the Cambrian explosion, experienced maximums of diversity followed by sharp winnowing.

== Dating of the geologic record ==
The geologic record is the strata (layers) of rock in the planet's crust and the science of geology is much concerned with the age and origin of all rocks to determine the history and formation of Earth and to understand the forces that have acted upon it. Geologic time is the timescale used to calculate dates in the planet's geologic history from its origin (currently estimated to have been some 4,600 million years ago) to the present day.

Radiometric dating measures the steady decay of radioactive elements in an object to determine its age. It is used to calculate dates for the older part of the planet's geological record. The theory is very complicated but, in essence, the radioactive elements within an object decay to form isotopes of each chemical element. Isotopes are atoms of the element that differ in mass but share the same general properties. Geologists are most interested in the decay of isotopes carbon-14 (into nitrogen-14) and potassium-40 (into argon-40). Carbon-14 aka radiocarbon dating works for organic materials that are less than about 50,000 years old. For older periods, the potassium-argon dating process is more accurate.

Radiocarbon dating is carried out by measuring how much of the carbon-14 and nitrogen-14 isotopes are found in a material. The ratio between the two is used to estimate the material's age. Suitable materials include wood, charcoal, paper, fabrics, fossils and shells. It is assumed that rock exists in layers according to age, with older beds below later ones. This is the basis of stratigraphy.

The ages of more recent layers are calculated primarily by the study of fossils, which are remains of ancient life preserved in the rock. These occur consistently and so a theory is feasible. Most of the boundaries in recent geologic time coincide with extinctions (e.g., the dinosaurs) and with the appearances of new species (e.g., hominids).

== The earliest Solar System ==
Nature timeline
← / Earliest stars; ← / Earliest galaxy; ← / Earliest quasar / black hole; ← / Omega Centauri; ← / Andromeda Galaxy; ← / Milky Way spirals; ← / NGC 188 star cluster; ← / Alpha Centauri; ← / Accelerated expansion; ← / Earth / Solar System; ← / Earliest known life; ← / Atmospheric oxygen; ← / Sexual reproduction; ← / Earliest fungi; ← / Earliest land plants; ← / Cambrian explosion; ← / Earliest mammals; ← / Earliest apes / humans
(billion years ago)

In the earliest Solar System history, the Sun, the planetesimals and the giant planets were formed. The inner Solar System aggregated more slowly than the outer, so the terrestrial planets, including Earth and Moon, formed later than the outer ones.

- c. 4,570 Ma – A supernova explosion that caused a shock wave in a dense region of the Milky Way galaxy (known as the primal supernova) seeds our galactic neighborhood with heavy elements that will be incorporated into the Earth. The Ca-Al-rich inclusions, which formed 2 million years before chondrules, are a key signature of a supernova explosion.
- c. 4,567 ±3 Ma – the rapid collapse of a hydrogen molecular cloud formed a third-generation Population I star, the Sun, in a region of the Galactic Habitable Zone (GHZ), about 25,000 light years from the center of the Milky Way Galaxy.
- c. 4,566 ±2 Ma – A protoplanetary disc (from which Earth eventually forms) emerges around the young Sun, which is in its T Tauri stage.
- c. 4,560–4,550 Ma – Proto-Earth forms at the outer (cooler) edge of the habitable zone of the Solar System. At this stage the solar constant of the Sun was only about 73% of its current value, but liquid water may have existed on the surface of the Proto-Earth, probably due to the greenhouse warming of high levels of methane and carbon dioxide present in the atmosphere. Early bombardment phase begins: because the solar neighbourhood is rife with large planetoids and debris, Earth experiences a number of giant impacts that help to increase its overall size.

== Extinction ==
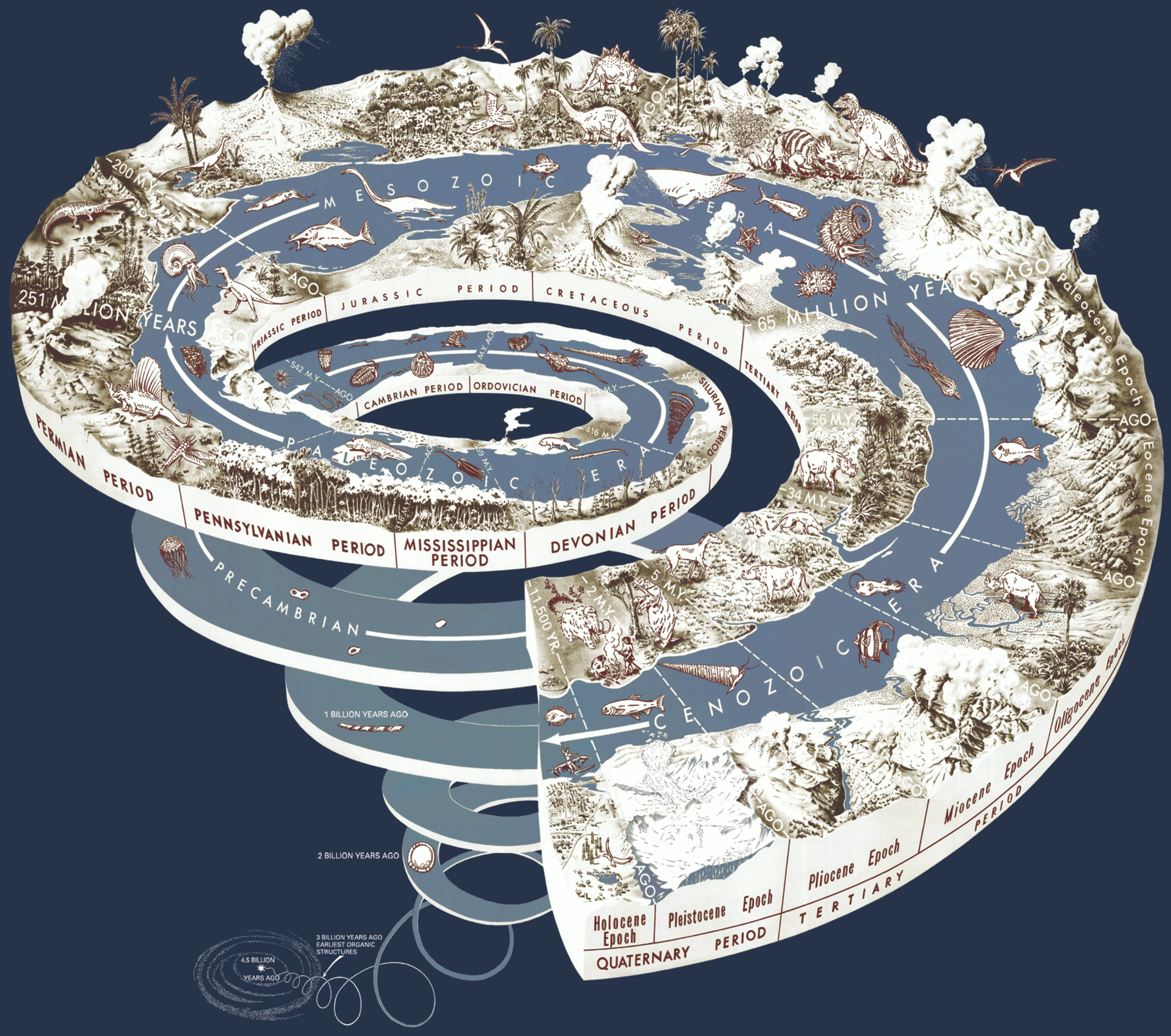
Visual representation of the history of life on Earth as a spiral

Species go extinct constantly as environments change, as organisms compete for environmental niches, and as genetic mutation leads to the rise of new species from older ones. At long irregular intervals, Earth's biosphere suffers a catastrophic die-off, a mass extinction, often comprising an accumulation of smaller extinction events over a relatively brief period.

The first known mass extinction was the Great Oxidation Event 2.4 billion years ago, which killed most of the planet's obligate anaerobes. Researchers have identified five other major extinction events in Earth's history, with estimated losses below:

- End Ordovician: 440 million years ago, 86% of all species lost, including most graptolites
- Late Devonian: 375 million years ago, 75% of species lost, including most trilobites
- End Permian, The Great Dying: 251 million years ago, 96% of species lost, including tabulate corals, and most trees and synapsids
- End Triassic: 200 million years ago, 80% of species lost, including all conodonts
- End Cretaceous: 66 million years ago, 76% of species lost, including all ammonites, mosasaurs, plesiosaurs, pterosaurs, and non-avian dinosaurs

Smaller extinction events have occurred in the periods between, with some dividing geologic time periods and epochs. The Holocene extinction event is currently under way.

Factors in mass extinctions include continental drift, changes in atmospheric and marine chemistry, volcanism and other aspects of mountain formation, changes in glaciation, changes in sea level, and impact events.

== Detailed timeline ==
In this timeline, Ma (for megaannum) means "million years ago," ka (for kiloannum) means "thousand years ago," and ya means "years ago."

=== Precambrian Supereon ===
- c. 4,533 Ma – The Precambrian (to c. 539 Ma) "supereon," formerly an era, is split into three geological time intervals called eons: Hadean, Archaean and Proterozoic. The latter two are sub-divided into several eras as currently defined. In total, the Precambrian comprises some 85% of geological time from the formation of Earth to the time when creatures first developed exoskeletons (i.e., hard outer parts) that left abundant fossil remains.

==== Hadean Eon ====
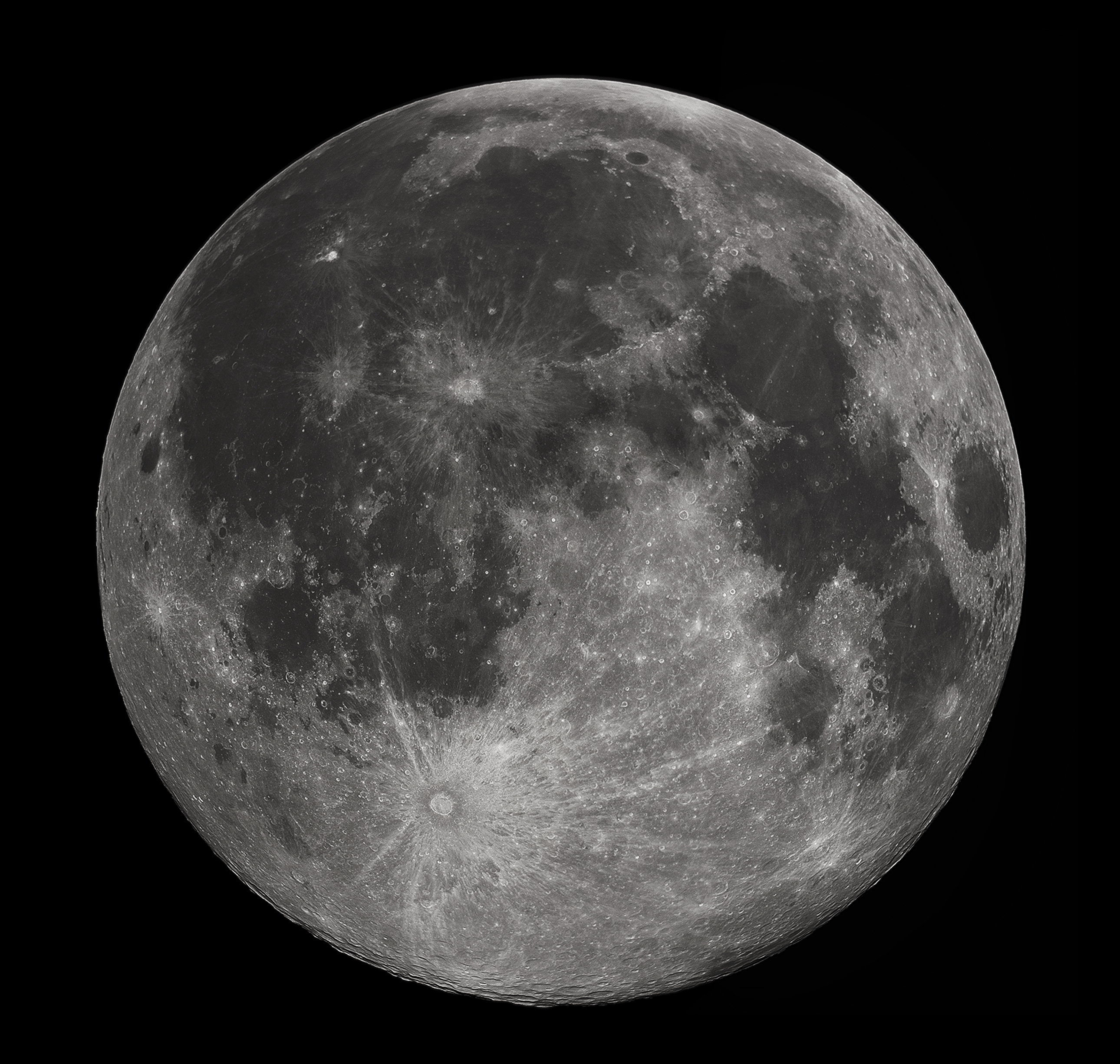
Moon

4540 Ma – 4031 Ma

Date	Event
4540 Ma	Planet Earth forms from the accretion disc revolving around the young Sun, perhaps preceded by formation of organic compounds necessary for life in the surrounding protoplanetary disk of cosmic dust.
4510 Ma	According to the giant-impact hypothesis, the Moon originated when Earth and the hypothesized planet Theia collided, sending into orbit myriad moonlets which eventually coalesced into our single Moon. The Moon's gravitational pull stabilised Earth's fluctuating axis of rotation, setting up regular climatic conditions favoring abiogenesis.
4404 Ma	Evidence of the first liquid water on Earth which were found in the oldest known zircon crystals.
4280–3770 Ma	Earliest possible appearance of life on Earth.

==== Archean Eon ====
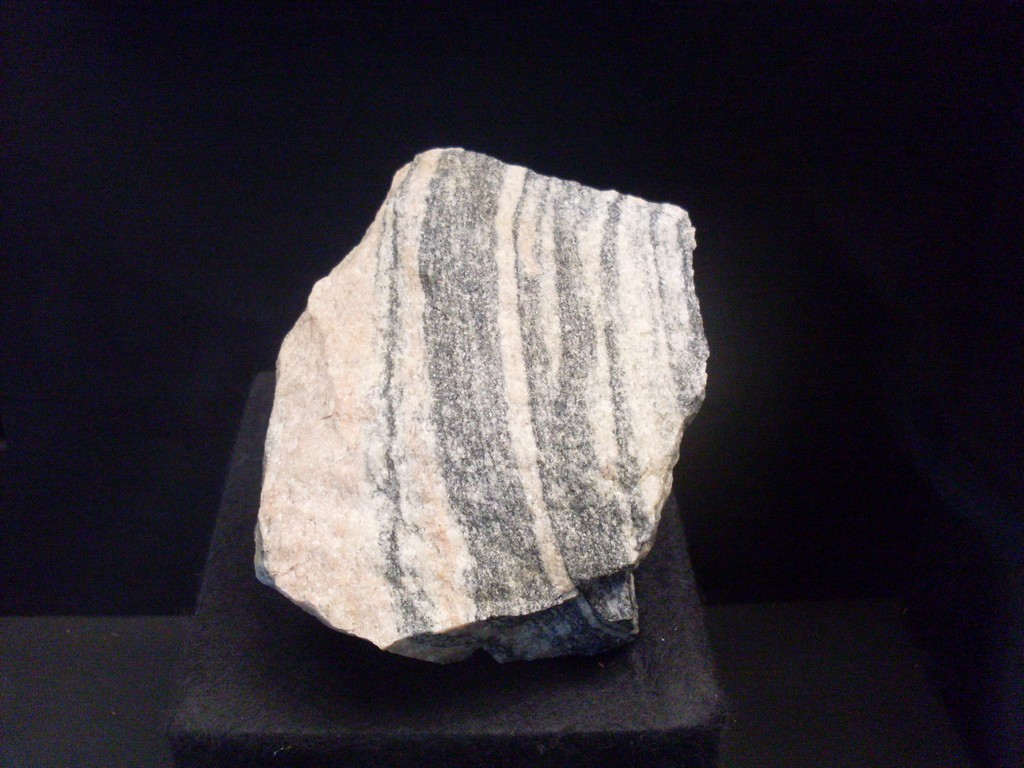
Fragment of the Acasta Gneiss exhibited at the Museum of Natural History in Vienna

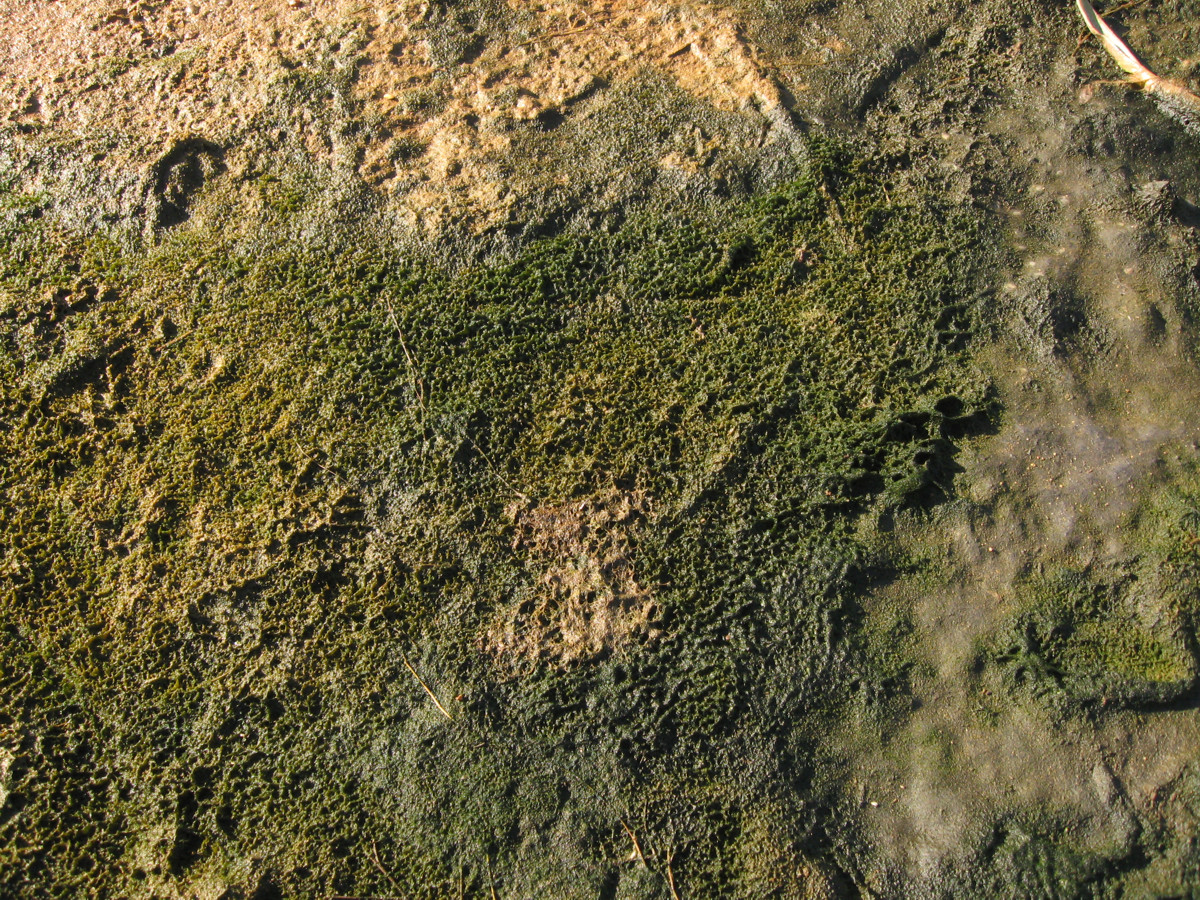
The cyanobacterial-algal mat, salty lake on the White Sea seaside

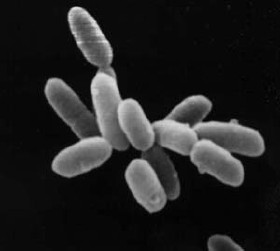
Halobacterium sp. strain NRC-1

4031 Ma – 2500 Ma

Date	Event
4100 Ma	Earliest possible preservation of biogenic carbon.
4100–3800 Ma	Late Heavy Bombardment (LHB): extended barrage by meteoroids impacting the inner planets. Thermal flux from widespread hydrothermal activity during the LHB may have aided abiogenesis and life's early diversification. Possible remains of biotic life were found in 4.1 billion-year-old rocks in Western Australia.
4000 Ma	Formation of a greenstone belt of the Acasta Gneiss of the Slave craton in northwest Canada - the oldest known rock belt.
3900–2500 Ma	Cells resembling prokaryotes appear. These first organisms are believed to have been chemoautotrophs, using carbon dioxide as a carbon source and oxidizing inorganic materials to extract energy.
3800 Ma	Formation of a greenstone belt of the Isua complex in western Greenland, whose isotope frequencies suggest the presence of life. The earliest evidence for life on Earth includes: 3.8 billion-year-old biogenic hematite in a banded iron formation of the Nuvvuagittuq Greenstone Belt in Canada; graphite in 3.7 billion-year-old metasedimentary rocks in western Greenland; and microbial mat fossils in 3.48 billion-year-old sandstone in Western Australia.
3800–3500 Ma	Last universal common ancestor (LUCA): split between bacteria and archaea. Bacteria develop primitive photosynthesis, which at first did not produce oxygen. These organisms exploit a proton gradient to generate adenosine triphosphate (ATP), a mechanism used by virtually all subsequent organisms.
3000 Ma	Photosynthesizing cyanobacteria using water as a reducing agent and producing oxygen as a waste product. Free oxygen initially oxidizes dissolved iron in the oceans, creating iron ore. Oxygen concentration in the atmosphere slowly rises, poisoning many bacteria and eventually triggering the Great Oxygenation Event.
2800 Ma	Oldest evidence for microbial life on land in the form of organic matter-rich paleosols, ephemeral ponds and alluvial sequences, some bearing microfossils.

==== Proterozoic Eon ====
Detail of the eukaryote endomembrane system and its components

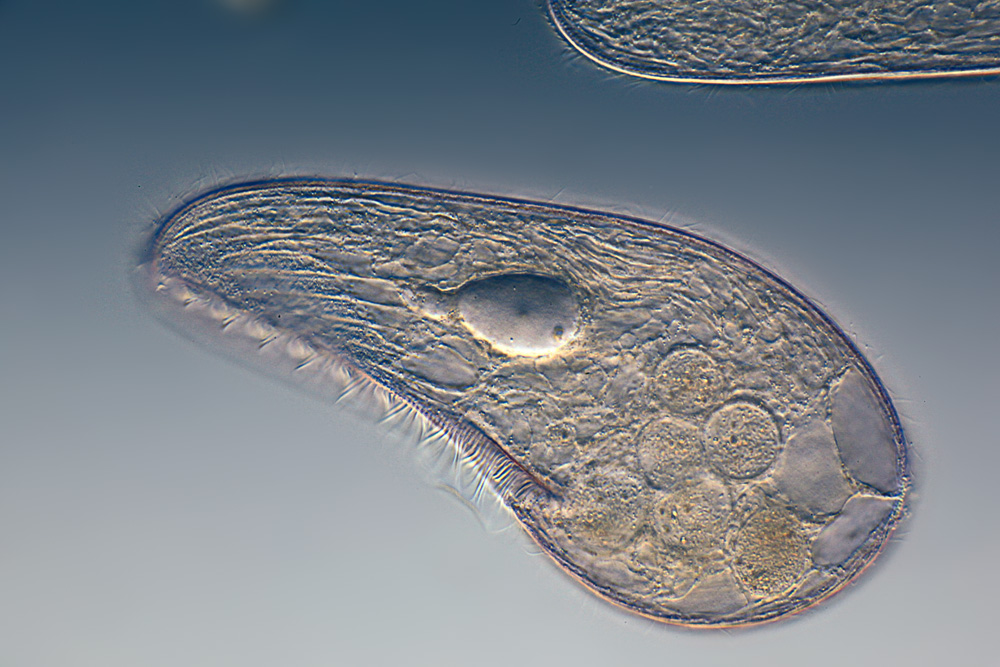
Blepharisma japonicum, a free-living ciliated protozoan

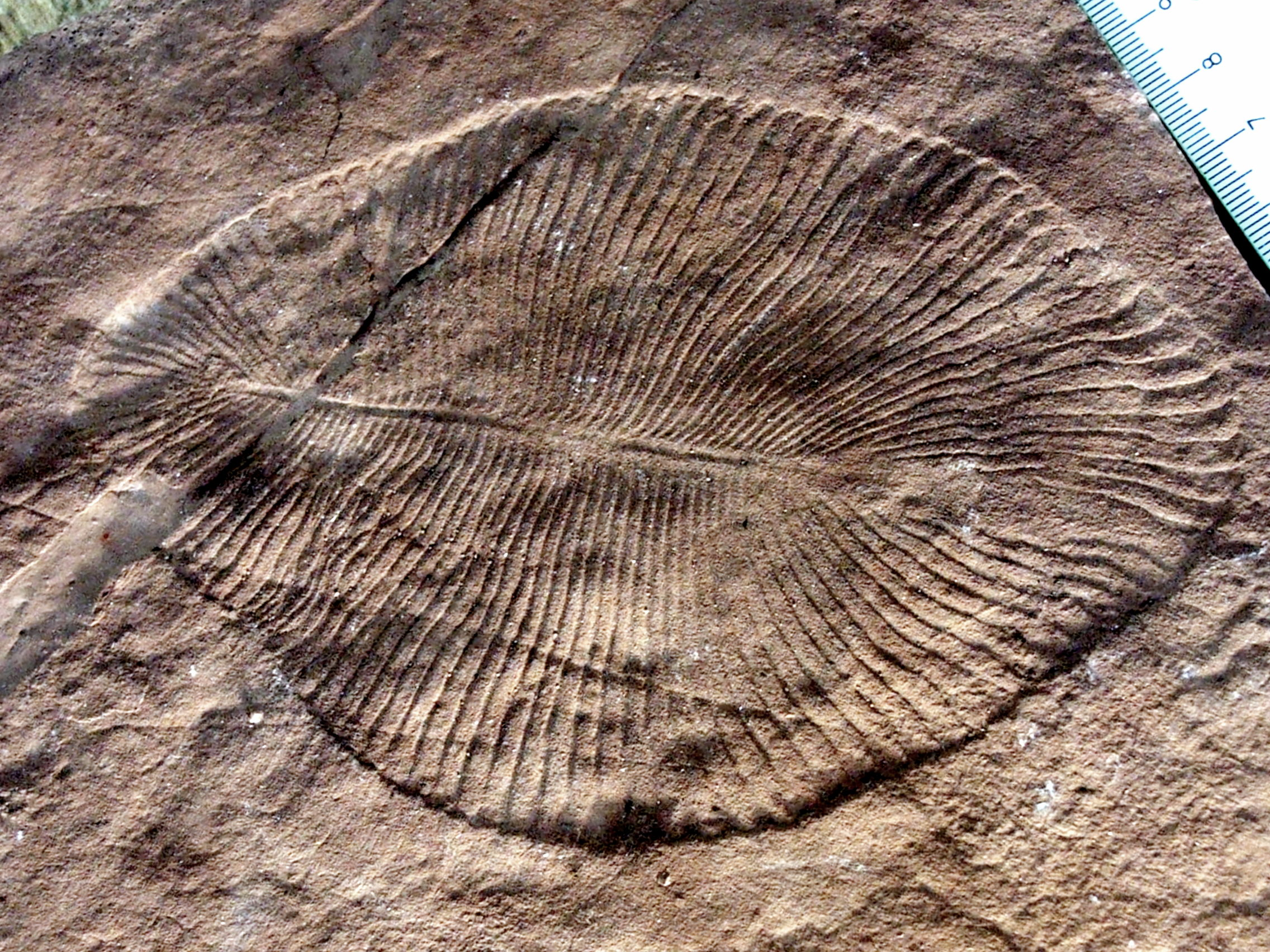
Dickinsonia costata, an iconic Ediacaran organism, displays the characteristic quilted appearance of Ediacaran enigmata.

2500 Ma – 539 Ma. Contains the Palaeoproterozoic, Mesoproterozoic and Neoproterozoic eras.

Date	Event
2500 Ma	Great Oxidation Event led by cyanobacteria's oxygenic photosynthesis. Commencement of plate tectonics with old marine crust dense enough to subduct.
2400 Ma	Possible land fungi evidence from molecules.
2023 Ma	Formation of the Vredefort impact structure, one of the largest and oldest verified impact structures on Earth. The crater is estimated to have been between 170–300 kilometres (110–190 mi) across when it first formed.
By 1850 Ma	Eukaryotic cells, containing membrane-bound organelles with diverse functions, probably derived from prokaryotes engulfing each other via phagocytosis. (See Symbiogenesis and Endosymbiont). Bacterial viruses (bacteriophages) emerge before or soon after the divergence of the prokaryotic and eukaryotic lineages. Red beds show an oxidising atmosphere, favouring the spread of eukaryotic life.
1500 Ma	Volyn biota, a collection of exceptionally well-preserved microfossils with varying morphologies.
By 1200 Ma	Meiosis and sexual reproduction in single-celled eukaryotes, possibly even in the common ancestor of all eukaryotes or in the RNA world. Sexual reproduction may have increased the rate of evolution.
By 1000 Ma	Molecular clock type evidence suggests that land fungi appear. First non-marine eukaryotes move onto land. They were photosynthetic and multicellular, indicating that plants evolved much earlier than originally thought.
750 Ma	Beginning of animal evolution.
720–630 Ma	Possible global glaciation which increased the atmospheric oxygen and decreased carbon dioxide, and was either caused by land plant evolution or resulted in it. Opinion is divided on whether it increased or decreased biodiversity or the rate of evolution.
600 Ma	Accumulation of atmospheric oxygen allows the formation of an ozone layer. Previous land-based life would probably have required other chemicals to attenuate ultraviolet radiation.
580–542 Ma	Ediacaran biota, the first large, complex aquatic multicellular organisms.
580–500 Ma	Cambrian explosion: most modern animal phyla appear.
550–540 Ma	Ctenophora (comb jellies), Porifera (sponges), Anthozoa (corals and sea anemones), Ikaria wariootia (an early Bilaterian).

=== Phanerozoic Eon ===
539 Ma – present

The Phanerozoic Eon (Greek: period of well-displayed life) marks the appearance in the fossil record of abundant, shell-forming and/or trace-making organisms. It is subdivided into three eras, the Paleozoic, Mesozoic and Cenozoic, with major mass extinctions at division points.

==== Palaeozoic Era ====
538.8 Ma – 251.9 Ma and contains the Cambrian, Ordovician, Silurian, Devonian, Carboniferous and Permian periods.

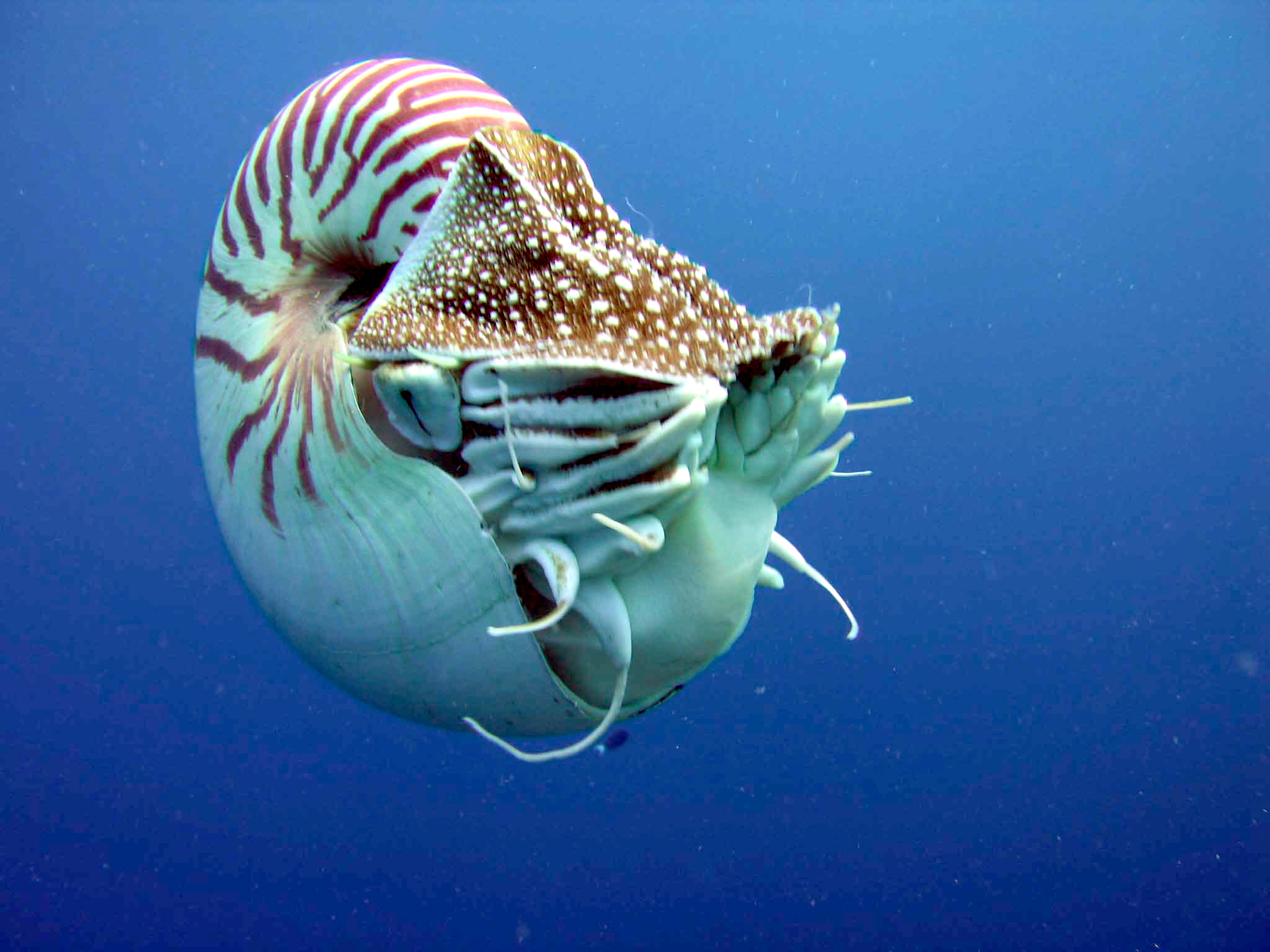
With only a handful of species surviving today, the Nautiloids flourished during the early Paleozoic era, from the Late Cambrian, where they constituted the main predatory animals.

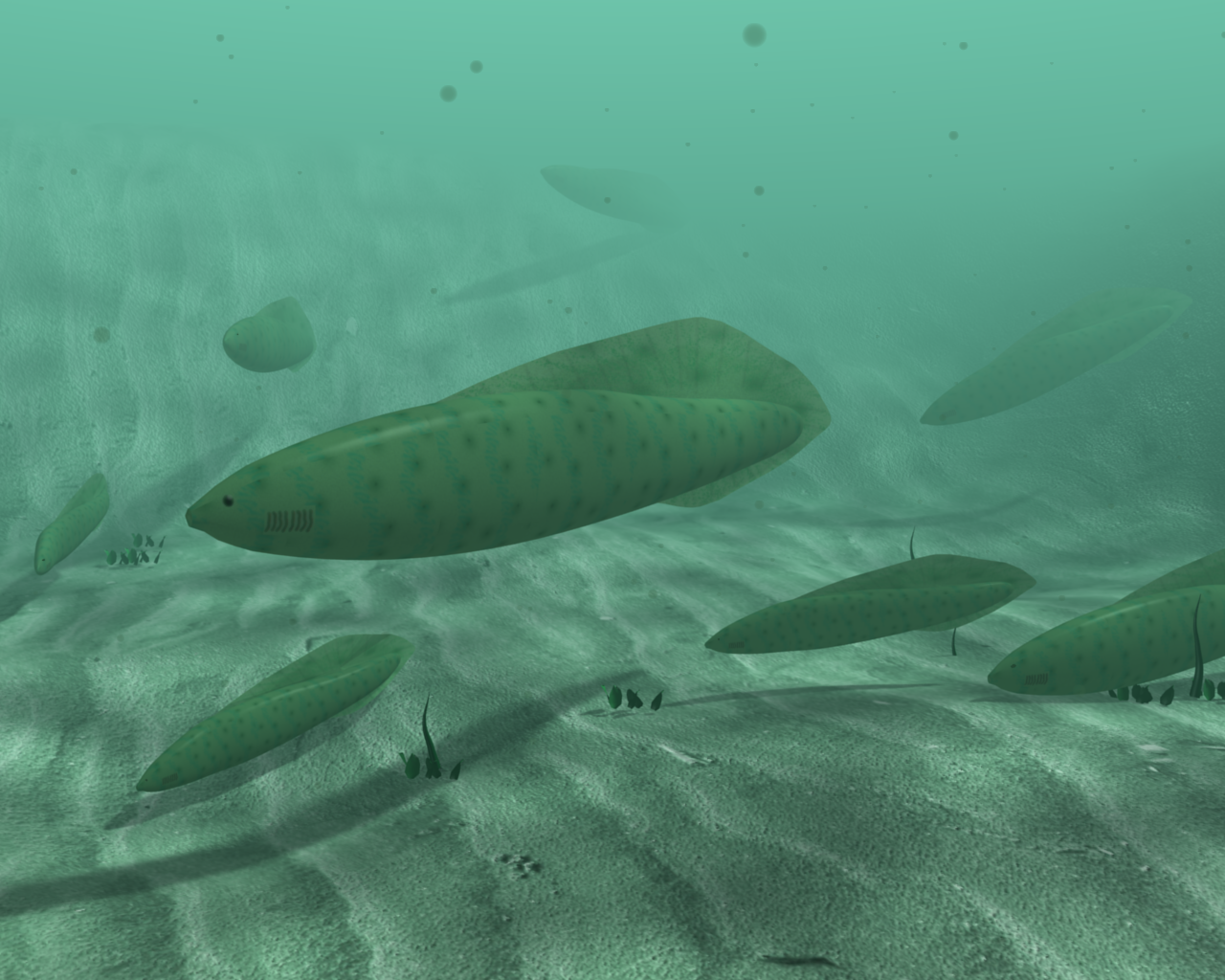
Haikouichthys, a jawless fish, is popularized as one of the earliest fishes and probably a basal chordate or a basal craniate.

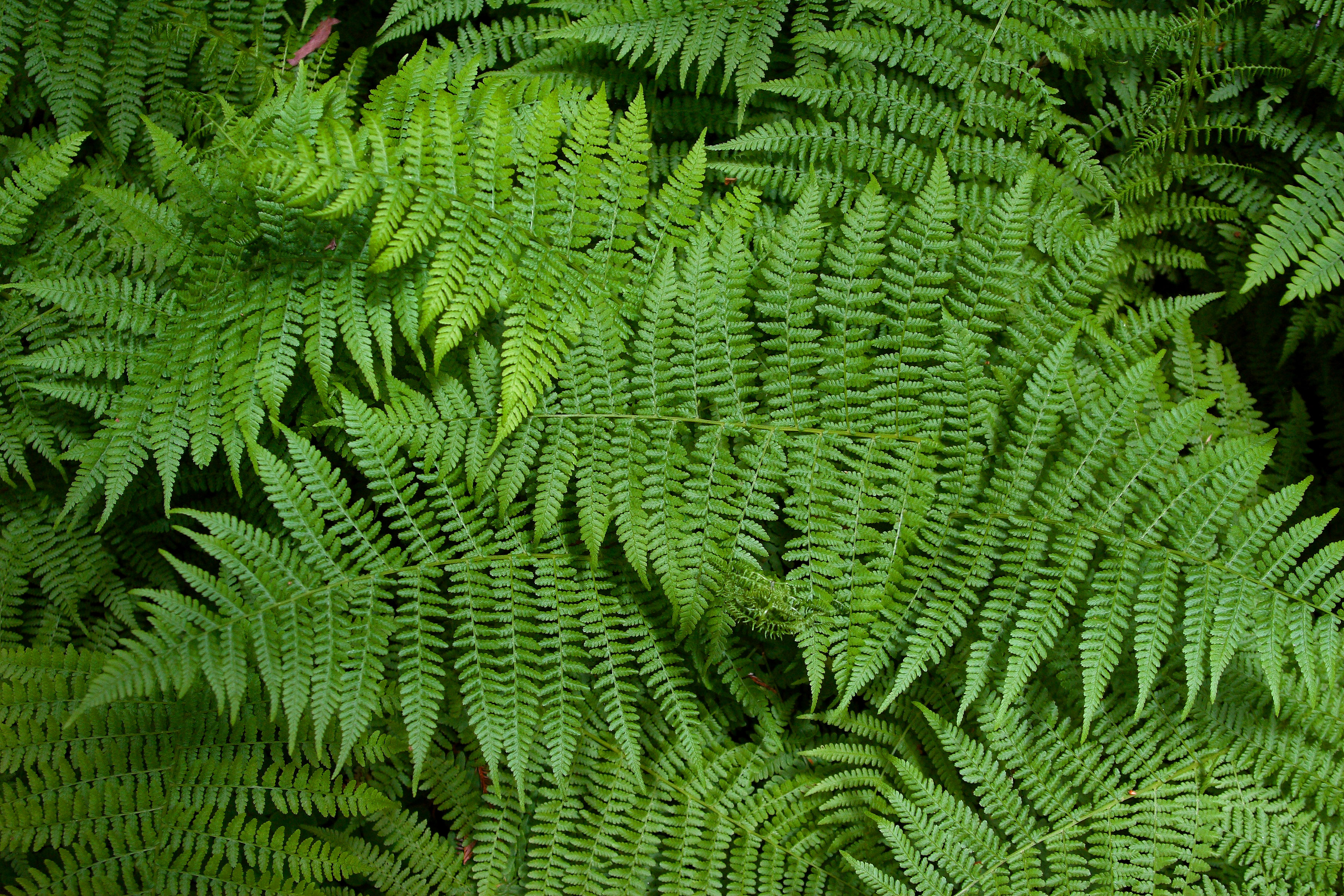
Ferns first appear in the fossil record about 360 million years ago in the late Devonian period.

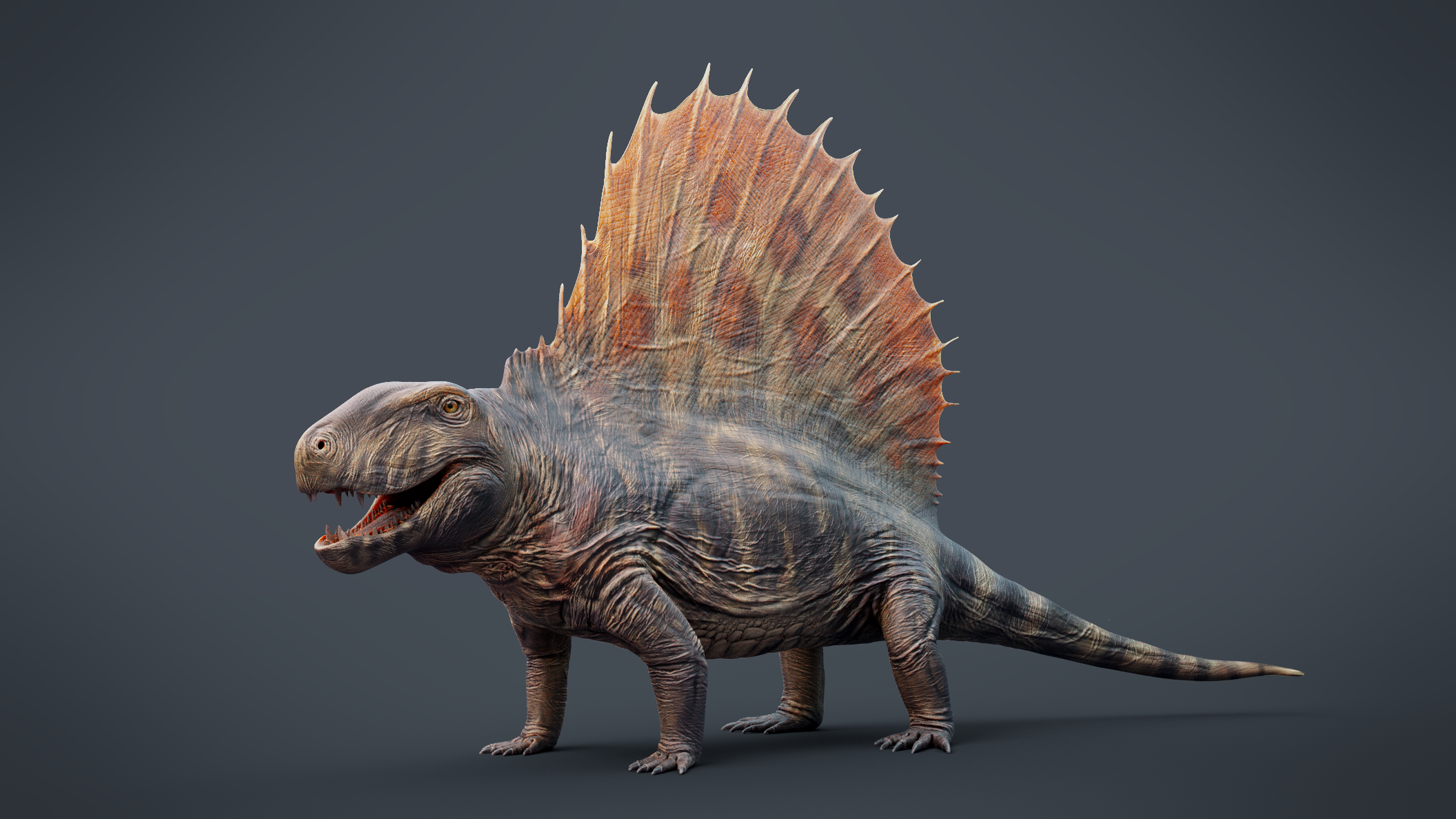
Synapsids such as Dimetrodon were the largest terrestrial vertebrates in the Permian period, 299 to 251 million years ago.

Date	Event
535 Ma	Major diversification of living things in the oceans: arthropods (e.g. trilobites, crustaceans), chordates, echinoderms, molluscs, brachiopods, foraminifers and radiolarians, etc.
530 Ma	The first known footprints on land date to 530 Ma.
520 Ma	Earliest graptolites.
511 Ma	Earliest crustaceans.
505 Ma	Fossilization of the Burgess Shale, |Jellyfish have existed since at least this time.
485 Ma	First vertebrates with true bones (jawless fishes).
450 Ma	First complete conodonts and echinoids appear.
440 Ma	First agnathan fishes: Heterostraci, Galeaspida, and Pituriaspida.
420 Ma	Earliest ray-finned fishes, trigonotarbid arachnids, and land scorpions.
410 Ma	First signs of teeth in fish. Earliest Nautilida, lycophytes, and trimerophytes.
488–400 Ma	First cephalopods (nautiloids) and chitons.
395 Ma	First lichens, stoneworts. Earliest harvestmen, mites, hexapods (springtails) and ammonoids. The earliest known tracks on land named the Zachelmie trackways which are possibly related to icthyostegalians.
375 Ma	Tiktaalik, a lobe-finned fish with some anatomical features similar to early tetrapods. It has been suggested to be a transitional species between fish and tetrapods.
365 Ma	Acanthostega is one of the earliest vertebrates capable of walking.
363 Ma	By the start of the Carboniferous Period, the Earth begins to resemble its present state. Insects roamed the land and would soon take to the skies; sharks swam the oceans as top predators, and vegetation covered the land, with seed-bearing plants and forests soon to flourish. Four-limbed tetrapods gradually gain adaptations which will help them occupy a terrestrial life-habit.
360 Ma	First crabs and ferns. Land flora dominated by seed ferns. The Xinhang forest grows around this time.
350 Ma	First large sharks, ratfishes, and hagfish; first crown tetrapods (with five digits and no fins and scales).
350 Ma	Diversification of amphibians.
325-335 Ma	First Reptiliomorpha.
330-320 Ma	First amniote vertebrates (Paleothyris).
320 Ma	Synapsids (precursors to mammals) separate from sauropsids (reptiles) in late Carboniferous.
305 Ma	The Carboniferous rainforest collapse occurs, causing a minor extinction event, as well as paving the way for amniotes to become dominant over amphibians and seed plants over ferns and lycophytes. First diapsid reptiles (e.g. Petrolacosaurus).
280 Ma	Earliest beetles, seed plants and conifers diversify while lepidodendrids and sphenopsids decrease. Terrestrial temnospondyl amphibians and pelycosaurs (e.g. Dimetrodon) diversify in species.
275 Ma	Therapsid synapsids separate from pelycosaur synapsids.
265 Ma	Gorgonopsians appear in the fossil record.
251.9–251.4 Ma	The Permian–Triassic extinction event eliminates over 90-95% of marine species. Terrestrial organisms were not as seriously affected as the marine biota. This "clearing of the slate" may have led to an ensuing diversification, but life on land took 30 million years to completely recover.

==== Mesozoic Era ====
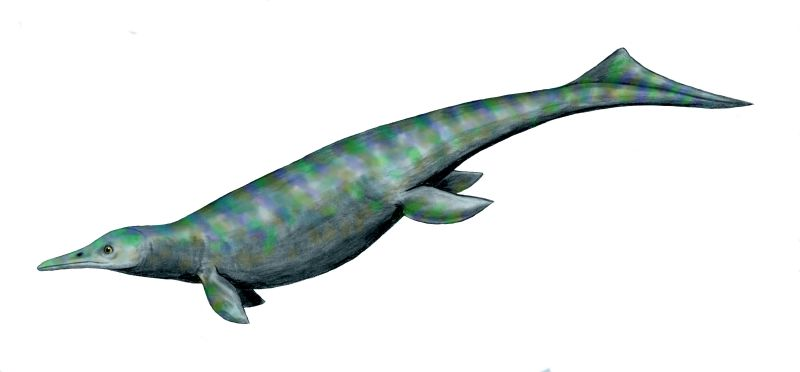
Utatsusaurus is the earliest-known ichthyopterygian.

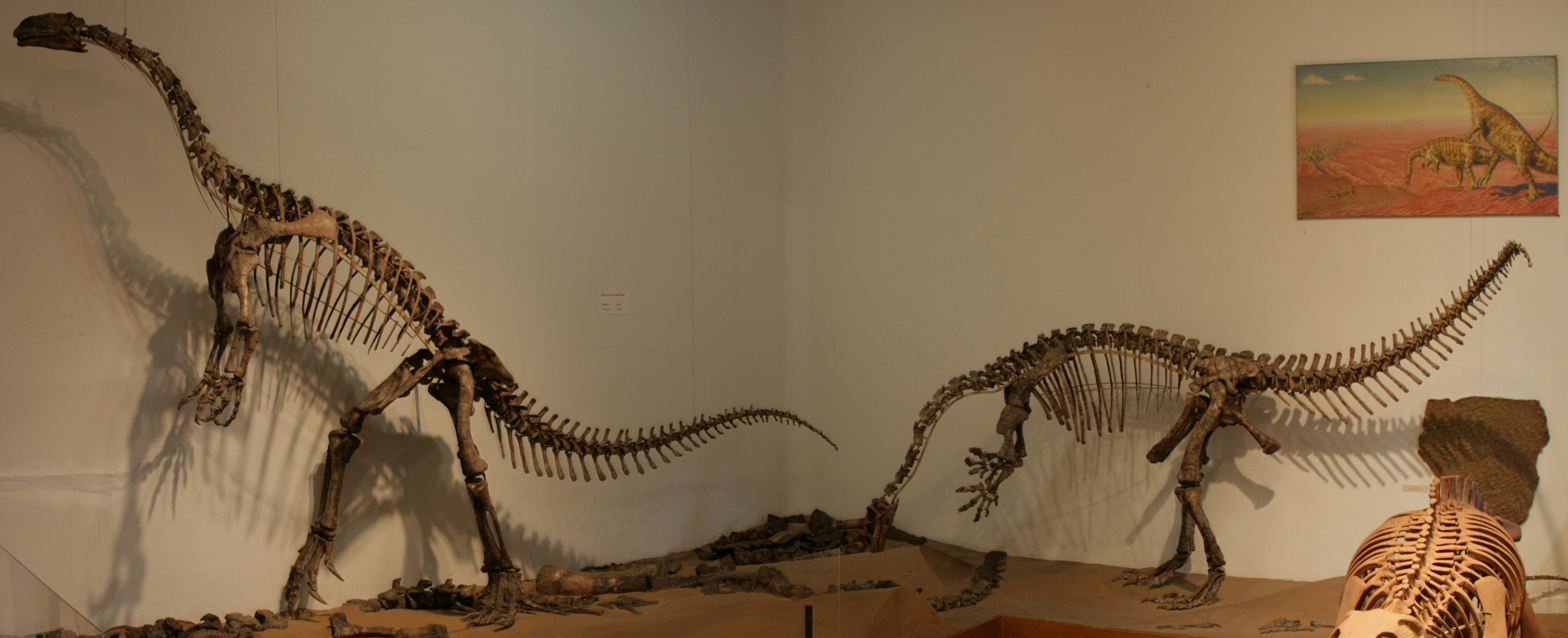
Plateosaurus engelhardti

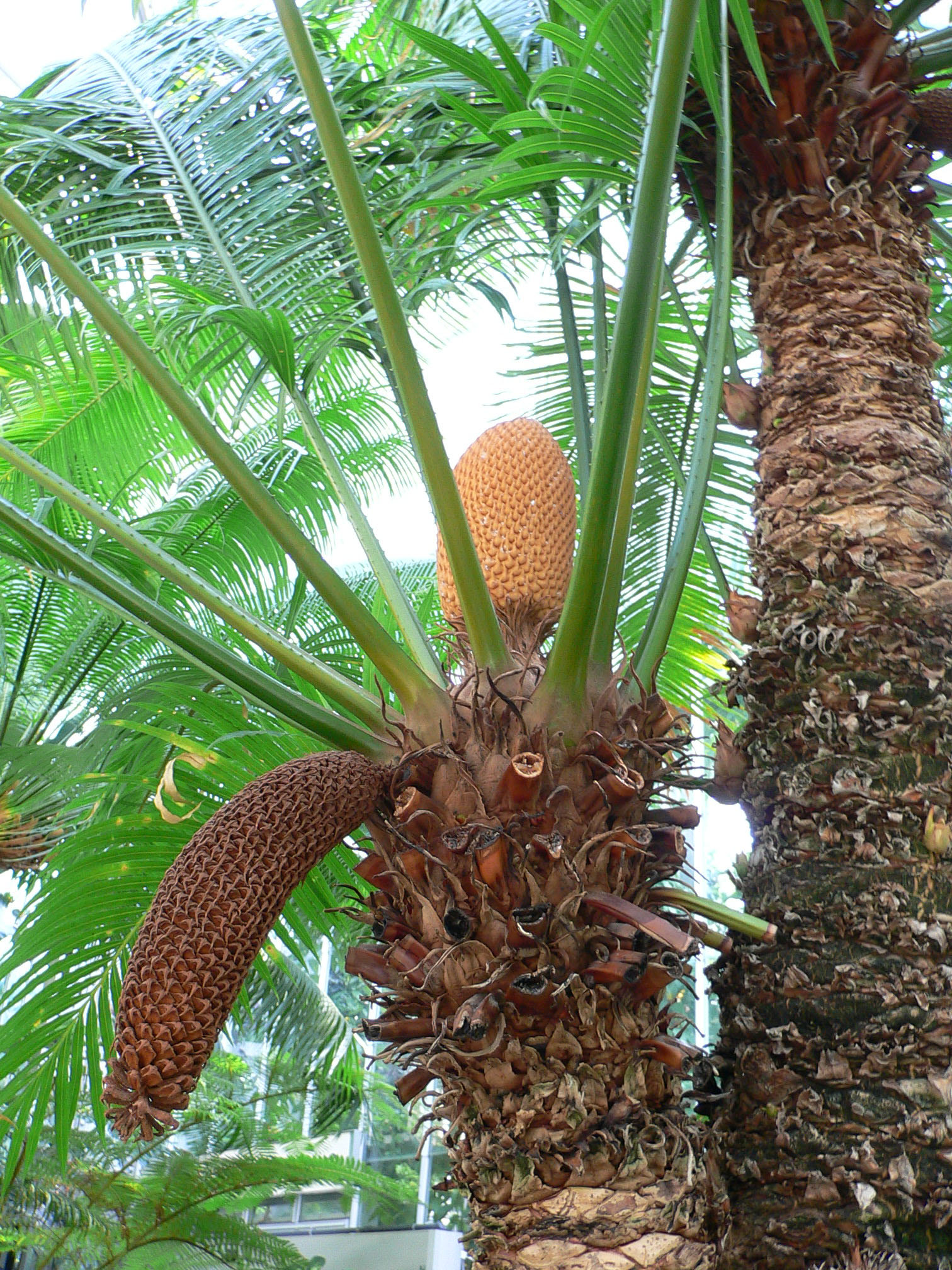
Cycas circinalis

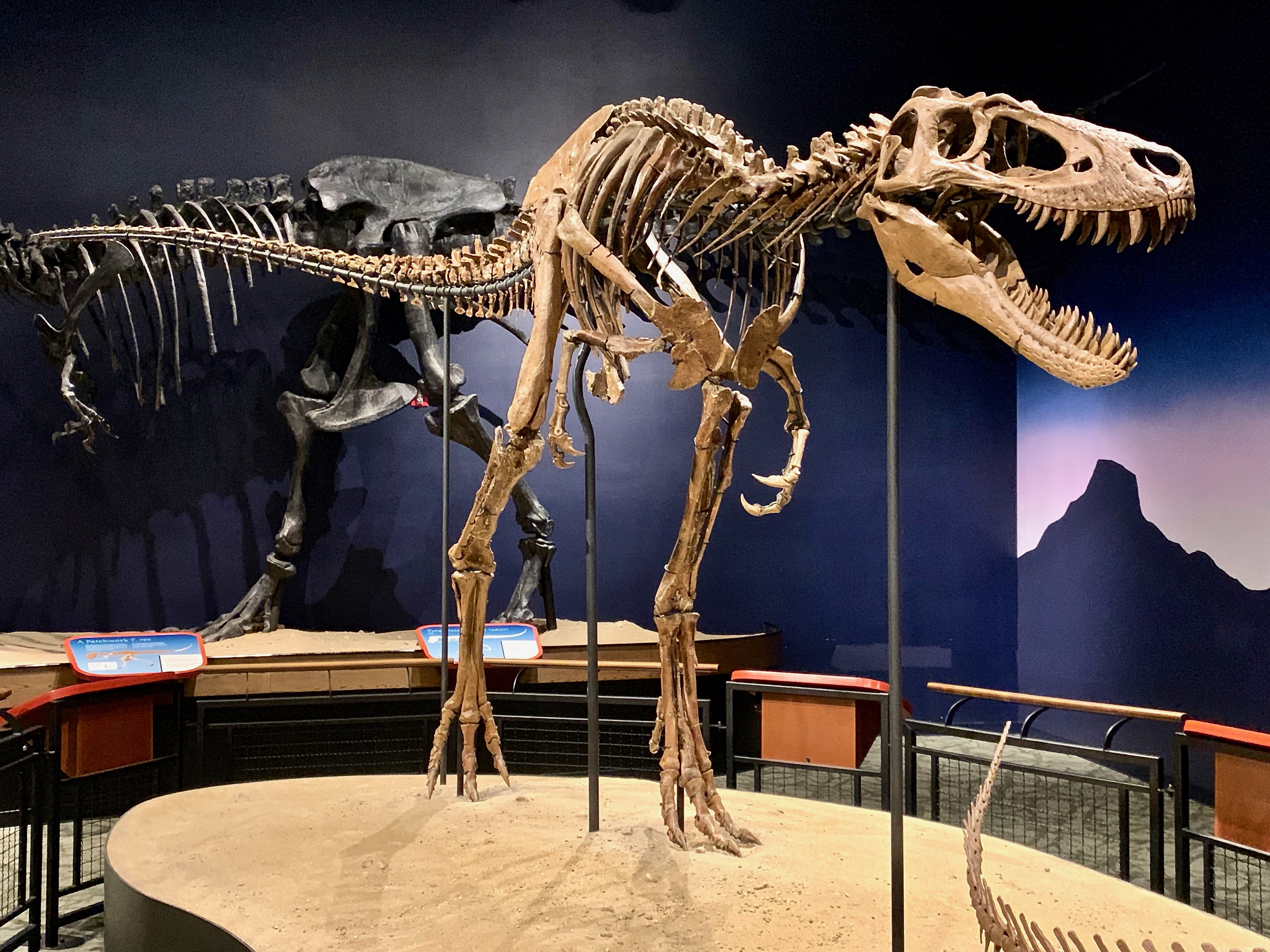
For about 150 million years, dinosaurs were the dominant land animals on Earth.

From 251.9 Ma to 66 Ma and containing the Triassic, Jurassic and Cretaceous periods.

Date	Event
250 Ma	Mesozoic marine revolution begins: increasingly well adapted and diverse predators stress sessile marine groups; the "balance of power" in the oceans shifts dramatically as some groups of prey adapt more rapidly and effectively than others.
250 Ma	Triadobatrachus massinoti is the earliest known frog.
248 Ma	Sturgeon and paddlefish (Acipenseridae) first appear.
245 Ma	Earliest ichthyosaurs
240 Ma	Increase in diversity of cynodonts and rhynchosaurs
225 Ma	Earliest dinosaurs (prosauropods), first cardiid bivalves, diversity in cycads, bennettitaleans, and conifers. First teleost fishes. First mammals (Adelobasileus).
220 Ma	Seed-producing Gymnosperm forests dominate the land; herbivores grow to huge sizes to accommodate the large guts necessary to digest the nutrient-poor plants. First flies and turtles (Odontochelys). First coelophysoid dinosaurs. First mammals from small-sized cynodonts, which transitioned towards a nocturnal, insectivorous, and endothermic lifestyle.
205 Ma	Massive Triassic/Jurassic extinction. It wipes out all pseudosuchians except crocodylomorphs, who transitioned to an aquatic habitat, while dinosaurs took over the land and pterosaurs filled the air.
200 Ma	First accepted evidence for viruses infecting eukaryotic cells (the group Geminiviridae). However, viruses are still poorly understood and may have arisen before "life" itself, or may be a more recent phenomenon. Major extinctions in terrestrial vertebrates and large amphibians. Earliest examples of armoured dinosaurs.
195 Ma	First pterosaurs with specialized feeding (Dorygnathus). First sauropod dinosaurs. Diversification in small, ornithischian dinosaurs: heterodontosaurids, fabrosaurids, and scelidosaurids.
190 Ma	Pliosauroids appear in the fossil record. First lepidopteran insects (Archaeolepis), hermit crabs, modern starfish, irregular echinoids, corbulid bivalves, and tubulipore bryozoans. Extensive development of sponge reefs.
176 Ma	First Stegosaurian dinosaurs.
170 Ma	Earliest salamanders, newts, cryptoclidids, elasmosaurid plesiosaurs, and cladotherian mammals. Sauropod dinosaurs diversify.
168 Ma	First lizards.
165 Ma	First rays and glycymeridid bivalves. First vampire squids.
163 Ma	Pterodactyloid pterosaurs first appear.
161 Ma	Ceratopsian dinosaurs appear in the fossil record (Yinlong) and the oldest known eutherian mammal: Juramaia.
160 Ma	Multituberculate mammals (genus Rugosodon) appear in eastern China.
155 Ma	First blood-sucking insects (ceratopogonids), rudist bivalves, and cheilostome bryozoans. Archaeopteryx, a possible ancestor to the birds, appears in the fossil record, along with triconodontid and symmetrodont mammals. Diversity in stegosaurian and theropod dinosaurs.
131 Ma	First pine trees.
140 Ma	Orb-weaver spiders appear.
135 Ma	Rise of the angiosperms. Some of these flowering plants bear structures that attract insects and other animals to spread pollen; other angiosperms are pollinated by wind or water. This innovation causes a major burst of animal coevolution. First freshwater pelomedusid turtles. Earliest krill.
120 Ma	Oldest fossils of heterokonts, including both marine diatoms and silicoflagellates.
115 Ma	First monotreme mammals.
114 Ma	Earliest bees.
112 Ma	Xiphactinus, a large predatory fish, appears in the fossil record.
110 Ma	First hesperornithes, toothed diving birds. Earliest limopsid, verticordiid, and thyasirid bivalves.
100 Ma	First ants.
100–95 Ma	Spinosaurus appears in the fossil record.
95 Ma	First crocodilians evolve.
90 Ma	Extinction of ichthyosaurs. Earliest snakes and nuculanid bivalves. Large diversification in angiosperms: magnoliids, rosids, hamamelidids, monocots, and ginger. Earliest examples of ticks. Probable origins of placental mammals (earliest undisputed fossil evidence is 66 Ma).
86–76 Ma	Diversification of therian mammals.
70 Ma	Multituberculate mammals increase in diversity. First yoldiid bivalves. First possible ungulates (Protungulatum).
68–66 Ma	Tyrannosaurus, the largest terrestrial predator of western North America, appears in the fossil record. First species of Triceratops.

==== Cenozoic Era ====
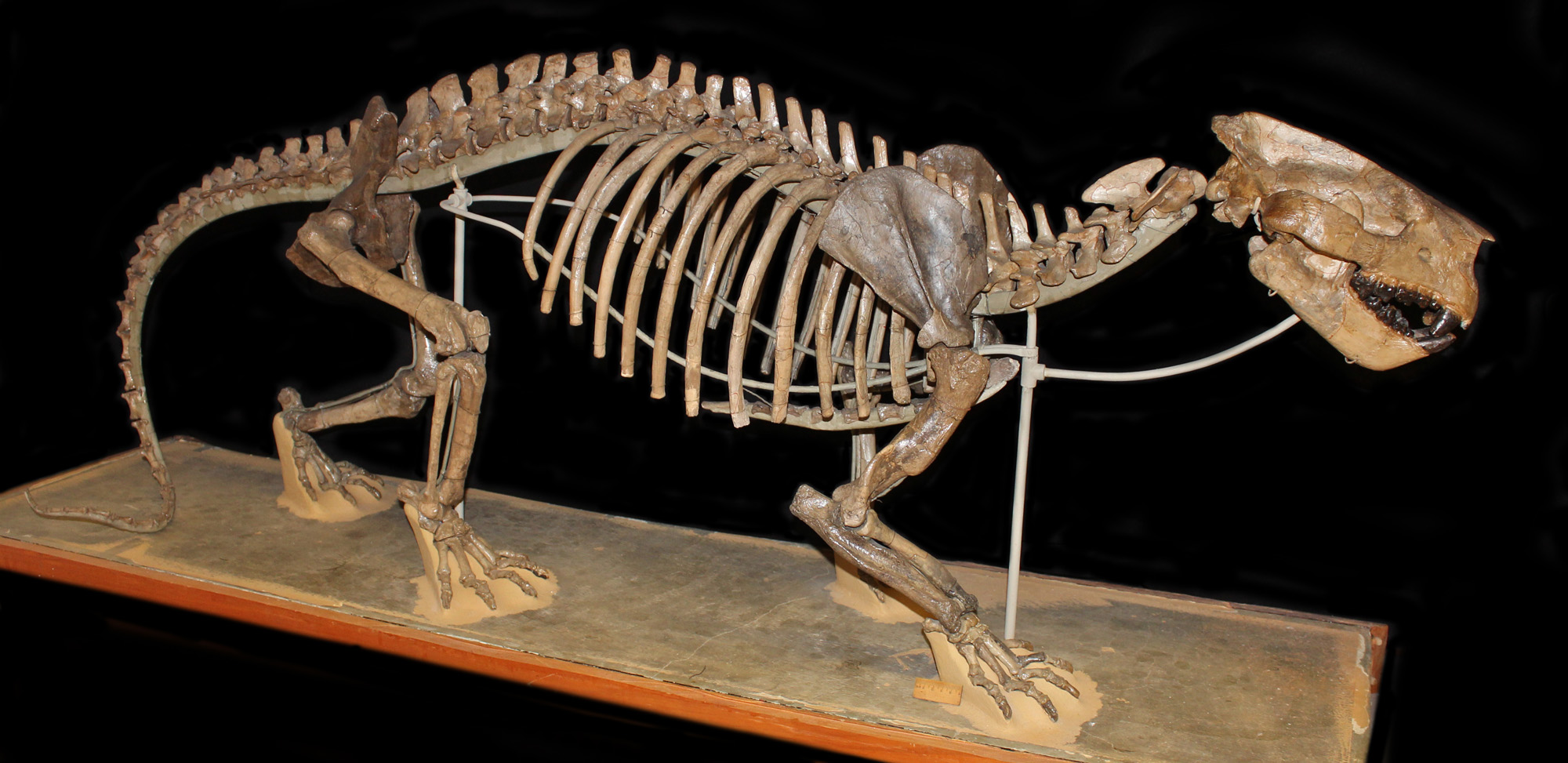
Mount of oxyaenid Patriofelis from the American Museum of Natural History

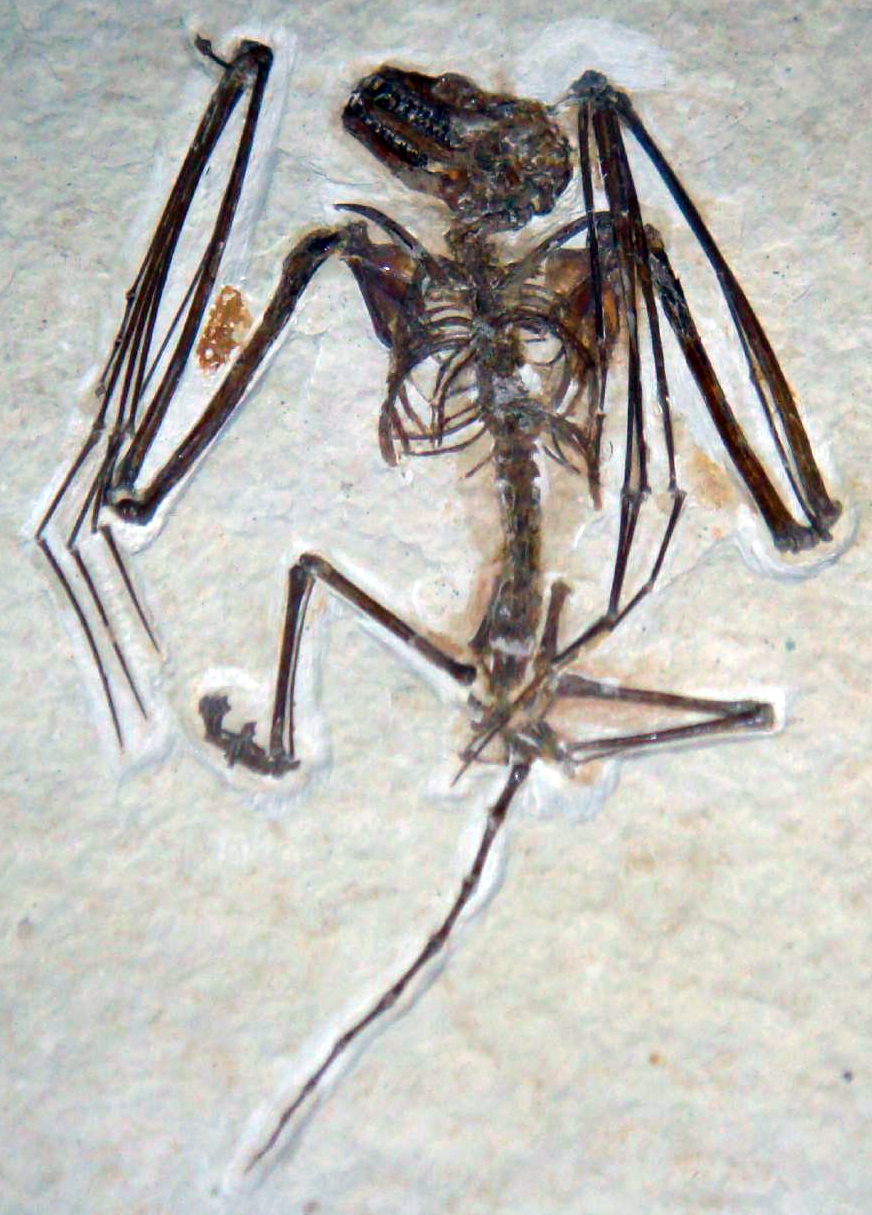
The bat Icaronycteris appeared 52.2 million years ago

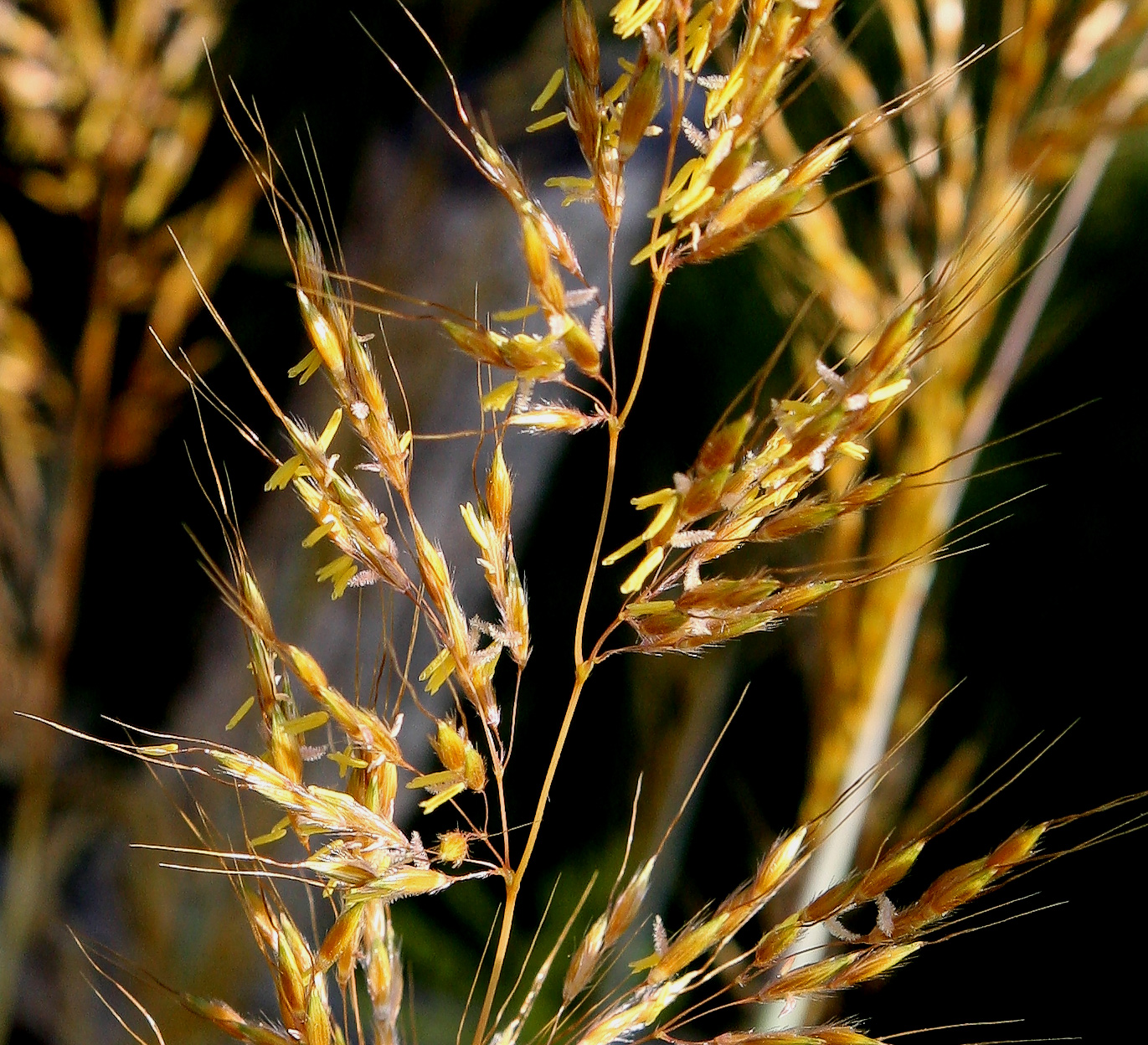
Grass flowers

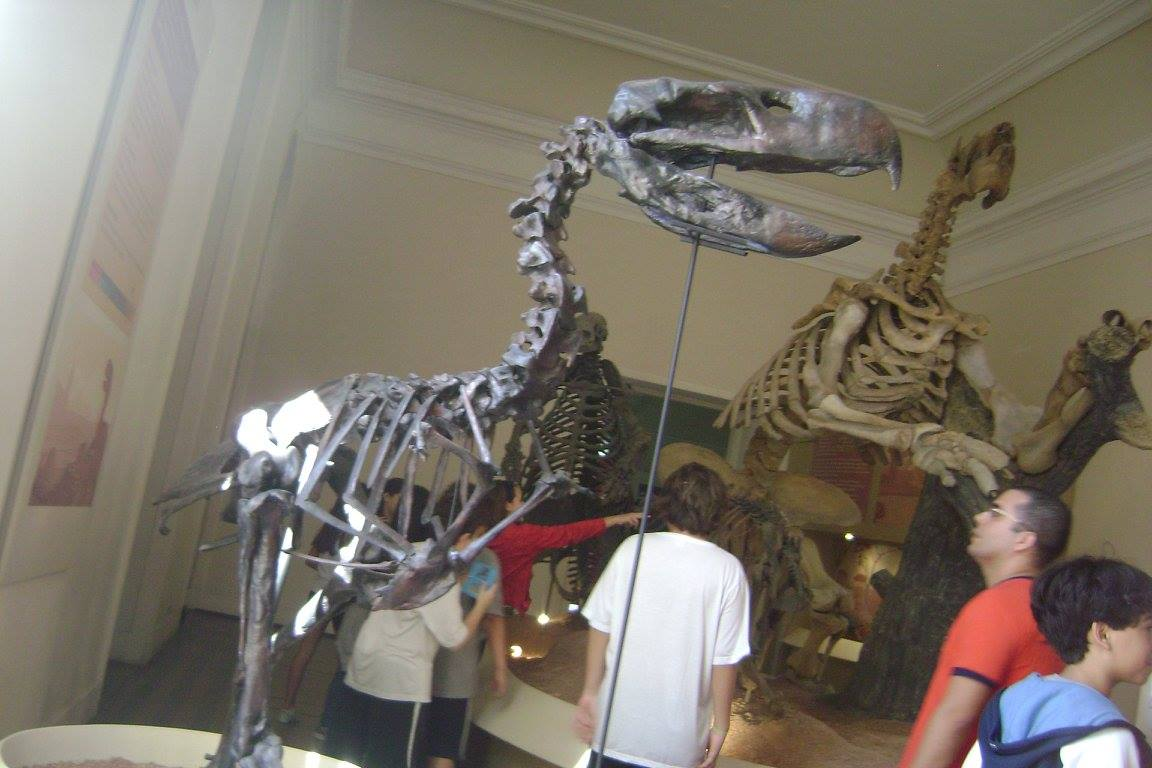
Reconstructed skeletons of flightless terror bird and ground sloth at the Museu Nacional, Rio de Janeiro

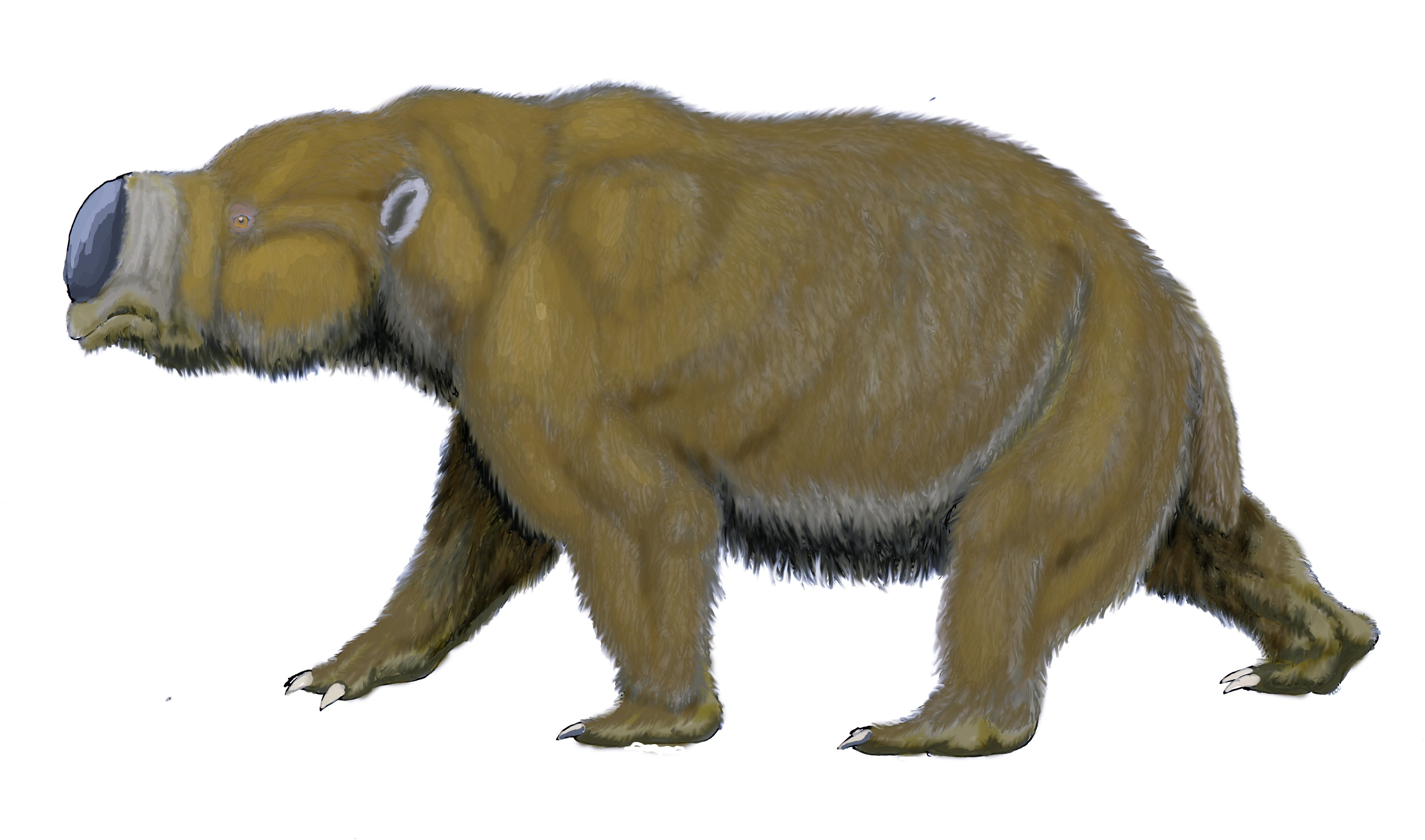
Diprotodon went extinct about 40,000 years ago as part of the Quaternary extinction event, along with every other Australian creature over 100 kg (220 lb).

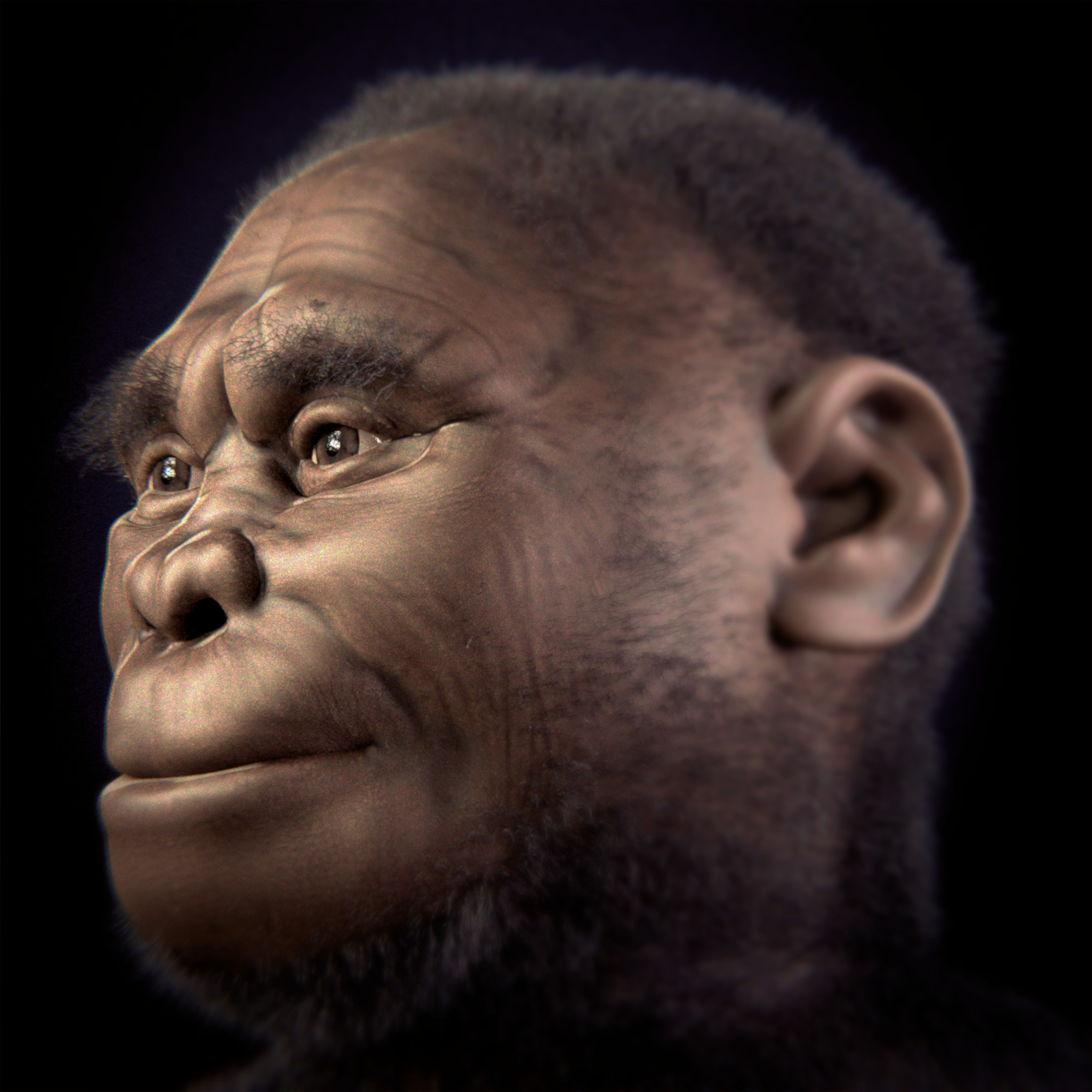
50,000 years ago several different human species coexisted on Earth including modern humans and Homo floresiensis (pictured).

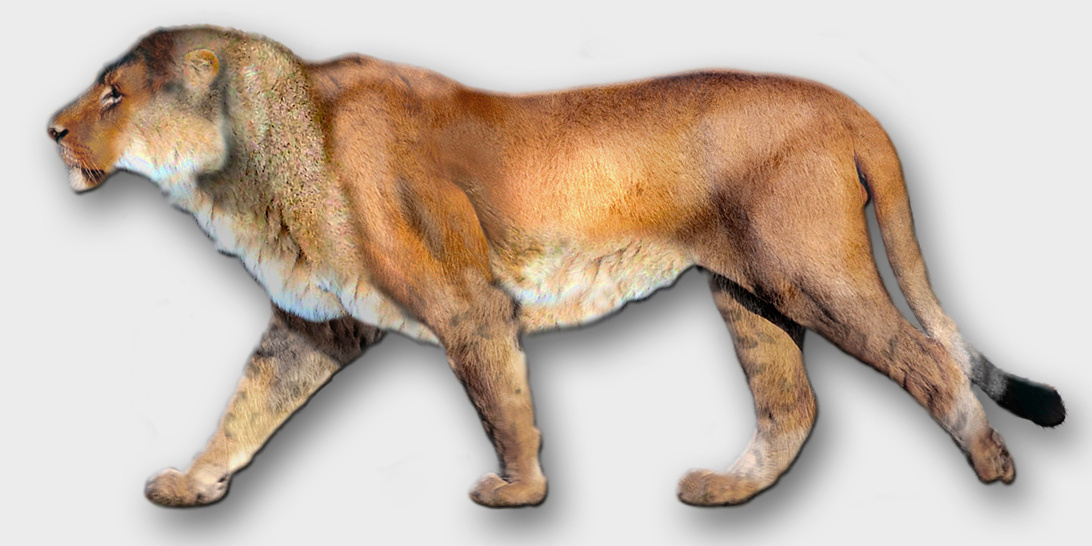
American lions exceeded extant lions in size and ranged over much of North America until 11,000 BP.

Cenozoic era (66 Ma – present)
Date	Event
66 Ma	The Cretaceous–Paleogene extinction event eradicates about half of all animal species, including mosasaurs, pterosaurs, plesiosaurs, ammonites, belemnites, rudist and inoceramid bivalves, most planktic foraminifers, and all of the dinosaurs excluding the birds.
66 Ma	Rapid dominance of conifers and ginkgos in high latitudes, along with mammals becoming the dominant species. First psammobiid bivalves. Earliest rodents. Rapid diversification in ants.
63 Ma	Evolution of the creodonts, an important group of meat-eating (carnivorous) mammals.
62 Ma	Evolution of the first penguins.
60 Ma	Diversification of large, flightless birds. Earliest true primates, along with the first semelid bivalves, edentate, carnivoran and lipotyphlan mammals, and owls. The ancestors of the carnivorous mammals (miacids) were alive.
59 Ma	Earliest sailfish appear.
56 Ma	Gastornis, a large flightless bird, appears in the fossil record.
55 Ma	Modern bird groups diversify (first song birds, parrots, loons, swifts, woodpeckers), first whale (Himalayacetus), earliest lagomorphs, armadillos, appearance of sirenian, proboscidean mammals in the fossil record. Flowering plants continue to diversify. The ancestor (according to theory) of the species in the genus Carcharodon, the early mako shark Isurus hastalis, is alive. Ungulates split into artiodactyla and perissodactyla, with some members of the former returning to the sea.
52 Ma	First bats appear (Onychonycteris).
50 Ma	Peak diversity of dinoflagellates and nannofossils, increase in diversity of anomalodesmatan and heteroconch bivalves, brontotheres, tapirs, rhinoceroses, and camels appear in the fossil record, diversification of primates.
40 Ma	Modern-type butterflies and moths appear. Extinction of Gastornis. Basilosaurus, one of the first of the giant whales, appeared in the fossil record.
38 Ma	Earliest bears.
37 Ma	First nimravid ("false saber-toothed cats") carnivores — these species are unrelated to modern-type felines. First alligators and ruminants.
35 Ma	Grasses diversify from among the monocot angiosperms; grasslands begin to expand. Slight increase in diversity of cold-tolerant ostracods and foraminifers, along with major extinctions of gastropods, reptiles, amphibians, and multituberculate mammals. Many modern mammal groups begin to appear: first glyptodonts, ground sloths, canids, peccaries, and the first eagles and hawks. Diversity in toothed and baleen whales.
33 Ma	Evolution of the thylacinid marsupials (Badjcinus).
30 Ma	First balanids and eucalypts, extinction of embrithopod and brontothere mammals, earliest pigs and cats.
28 Ma	Paraceratherium appears in the fossil record, the largest terrestrial mammal that ever lived. First pelicans.
25 Ma	Pelagornis sandersi appears in the fossil record, the largest flying bird that ever lived.
25 Ma	First deer.
24 Ma	First pinnipeds.
23 Ma	Earliest ostriches, trees representative of most major groups of oaks have appeared by now.
20 Ma	First giraffes, hyenas, and giant anteaters, increase in bird diversity.
17 Ma	First birds of the genus Corvus (crows).
15 Ma	Genus Mammut appears in the fossil record, first bovids and kangaroos, diversity in Australian megafauna.
10 Ma	Grasslands and savannas are established, diversity in insects, especially ants and termites, horses increase in body size and develop high-crowned teeth, major diversification in grassland mammals and snakes.
9.5 Ma	Great American Interchange, where various land and freshwater faunas migrated between North and South America. Armadillos, opossums, hummingbirds, Phorusrhacids, Ground Sloths, Glyptodonts, and Meridiungulates traveled to North America, while horses, tapirs, saber-toothed cats, jaguars, bears, coaties, ferrets, otters, skunks and deer entered South America.
9 Ma	First platypuses.
6.5 Ma	First hominins (Sahelanthropus).
6 Ma	Australopithecines diversify (Orrorin, Ardipithecus).
5 Ma	First tree sloths and hippopotami, diversification of grazing herbivores like zebras and elephants, large carnivorous mammals like lions and the genus Canis, burrowing rodents, kangaroos, birds, and small carnivores, vultures increase in size, decrease in the number of perissodactyl mammals. Extinction of nimravid carnivores. First leopard seals.
4.8 Ma	Mammoths appear in the fossil record.
4.5 Ma	Marine iguanas diverge from land iguanas.
4 Ma	Australopithecus evolves. Stupendemys appears in the fossil record as the largest freshwater turtle, first modern elephants, giraffes, zebras, lions, rhinoceros and gazelles appear in the fossil record
3.6 Ma	Blue whales grow to modern size.
3 Ma	Earliest swordfish.
2.7 Ma	Paranthropus evolves.
2.5 Ma	Earliest species of Arctodus and Smilodon evolve.
2 Ma	First members of genus Homo, Homo Habilis, appear in the fossil record. Diversification of conifers in high latitudes. The eventual ancestor of cattle, aurochs (Bos primigenus), evolves in India.
1.7 Ma	Australopithecines go extinct.
1.2 Ma	Evolution of Homo antecessor. The last members of Paranthropus die out.
1.0 Ma	First coyotes.
810 ka	First wolves
600 ka	Evolution of Homo heidelbergensis.
400 ka	First polar bears.
350 ka	Evolution of Neanderthals.
300 ka	Gigantopithecus, a giant relative of the orangutan from Asia dies out.
250 ka	Anatomically modern humans appear in Africa. Around 50 ka they start colonising the other continents, replacing Neanderthals in Europe and other hominins in Asia.
70 ka	Genetic bottleneck in humans (Toba catastrophe theory).
40 ka	Last giant monitor lizards (Varanus priscus) die out.
35–25 ka	Extinction of Neanderthals. Domestication of dogs.
14 ka	Last woolly rhinoceros (Coelodonta antiquitatis) are believed to have gone extinct.
11 ka	Short-faced bears vanish from North America, with the last giant ground sloths dying out. All Equidae become extinct in North America. Domestication of various ungulates.
10 ka	Holocene epoch starts after the Last Glacial Maximum. Last mainland species of woolly mammoth (Mammuthus primigenus) die out, as does the last Smilodon species.
1 ka	The giant lemur dies out.

== See also ==
- Evolutionary history of plants (timeline)
- Geologic time scale
- History of Earth
- Sociocultural evolution
- Timeline of human evolution
