= Paleoatmosphere =

Ancient atmosphere, particularly of Earth, in the geological past

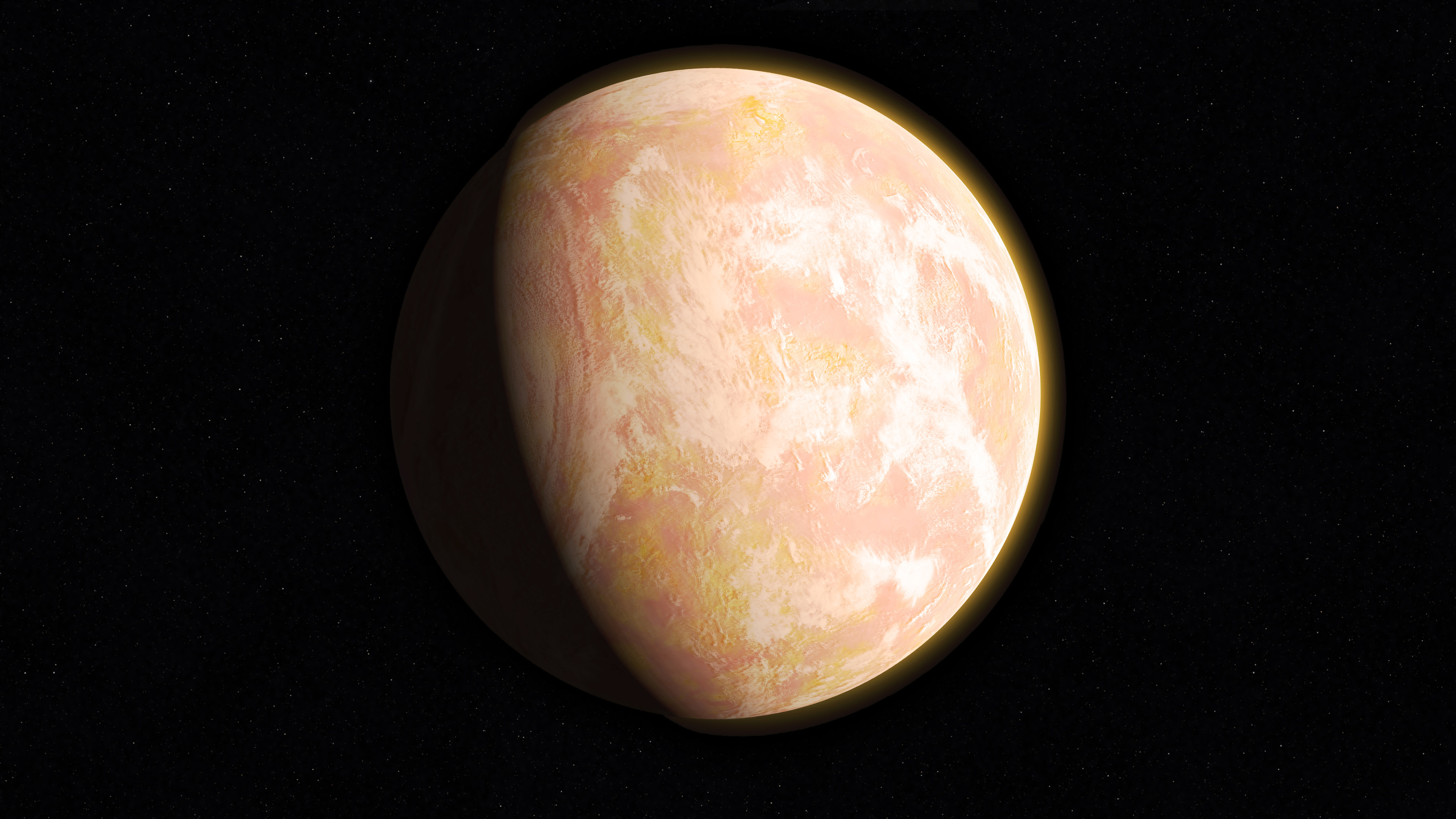
The Pale Orange Dot: an artist's interpretation of what the Earth may have looked like when haze built up in its atmosphere.

A paleoatmosphere (or palaeoatmosphere) is an atmosphere, particularly that of Earth, at some unspecified time in the geological past.

When regarding geological history of Earth, the paleoatmosphere can be chronologically divided into the following phases:

- the Hadean first atmosphere or primary atmosphere (also known as the primordial atmosphere or proto-atmosphere), whose composition resembled that of the solar nebula;
- the Archean second atmosphere or secondary atmosphere (also known as the prebiotic atmosphere), which is a reducing atmosphere that became nitrogen-abundant due to volcanic outgassing and meteoric injections during the Late Heavy Bombardment, and;
- the Proterozoic and Phanerozoic third atmosphere or tertiary atmosphere (also known as the biotic atmosphere), which started to contain free elemental oxygen (dioxygen) due to ongoing biotic photosynthesis finally having released enough byproduct oxygen to overwhelm the reducing capability of the preceding second atmosphere. The appearance of free oxygen during the Neoarchean–Paleoproterozoic boundary, i.e. the Great Oxygenation Event (GOE), permanently changed the redox property of the atmosphere, and this new oxidative atmosphere can be subsequently further subdivided into several more periods of oxygenation and anoxic events associated with geological and climate catastrophes, mass extinctions and the evolution, diversification, radiations and successions of photoautotrophs (cyanobacteria, algae and plants) before it eventually reached the current Holocene state.

== Composition ==
The composition of Earth's paleoatmosphere can be inferred today from the study of the abundance of proxy materials such as iron oxides and charcoal and the fossil data, such as the stomatal density of fossil leaves in geological deposits. Although today's atmosphere is dominated by nitrogen (about 78%), oxygen (about 21%), and argon (about 1%), the pre-biological atmosphere is thought to have been a highly reducing atmosphere, having virtually no free oxygen, virtually no argon, which is generated by the radioactive decay of ^{40}K, and to have been dominated by nitrogen, carbon dioxide and methane.

Appreciable concentrations of free oxygen were probably not present until about 2,500 million years ago (Myr). After the Great Oxidation Event, quantities of oxygen produced as a by-product of photosynthesis by cyanobacteria (sometimes erroneously referred to as blue-green algae) began to exceed the quantities of chemically reducing materials, notably dissolved iron. By the beginning of the Cambrian period 541 Ma, free oxygen concentrations had increased sufficiently to enable the evolution of multicellular organisms. Following the subsequent appearance, rapid evolution and radiation of land plants, which covered much of the Earth's land surface, beginning about 450 Ma, oxygen concentrations reached and later exceeded current values (about 21%) during the early Carboniferous, when atmospheric carbon dioxide was drawn down below current concentrations (about 400 ppm) by oxygenic photosynthesis. This may have contributed to the Carboniferous rainforest collapse during the Moscovian and Kasimovian ages of the Pennsylvanian subperiod.

== Indirect measurements ==
Geological studies of ancient rock formations can give information on paleoatmospheric composition, pressure, density, etc. at specific points in Earth's history.

=== Density and pressure ===
A 2012 study looked at the imprints made by falling raindrops onto freshly deposited volcanic ash, laid down in the Archean Eon 2,700 Ma in the Ventersdorp Supergroup, South Africa. They linked the terminal velocity of the raindrops directly to the air density of the paleoatmosphere and showed that it had less than twice the density of the modern atmosphere, and likely had similar if not lower density.

A similar study in 2016 looked at the size distribution of gas bubbles in basaltic lava flows that solidified at sea level also during the Archean (~2,700 Ma). They found an atmospheric pressure of only 0.23 ± 0.23 bar (23 kPa).

Both results contradict theories that suggest the Archean was kept warm during the Faint Young Sun period by extremely high levels of carbon dioxide or nitrogen.

=== Oxygen content ===
A 2016 study performed mass spectrometry on air bubbles trapped inside rock salt deposited 813 Myr ago. They detected an oxygen content of 10.9%, much higher than had been expected from indirect measures. This suggested the Neoproterozoic oxygenation event may have happened much earlier than previously thought.

== See also ==
- Prebiotic atmosphere – Second atmosphere on Earth
- Atmosphere of Earth#Evolution of Earth's atmosphere – Gas layer surrounding Earth
- Great Oxidation Event#The early atmosphere – Paleoproterozoic surge in atmospheric oxygen
- Paleoclimatology – Study of changes in ancient climate
- Reducing atmosphere – Atmosphere containing reducing agents
