= Secondary atmosphere =

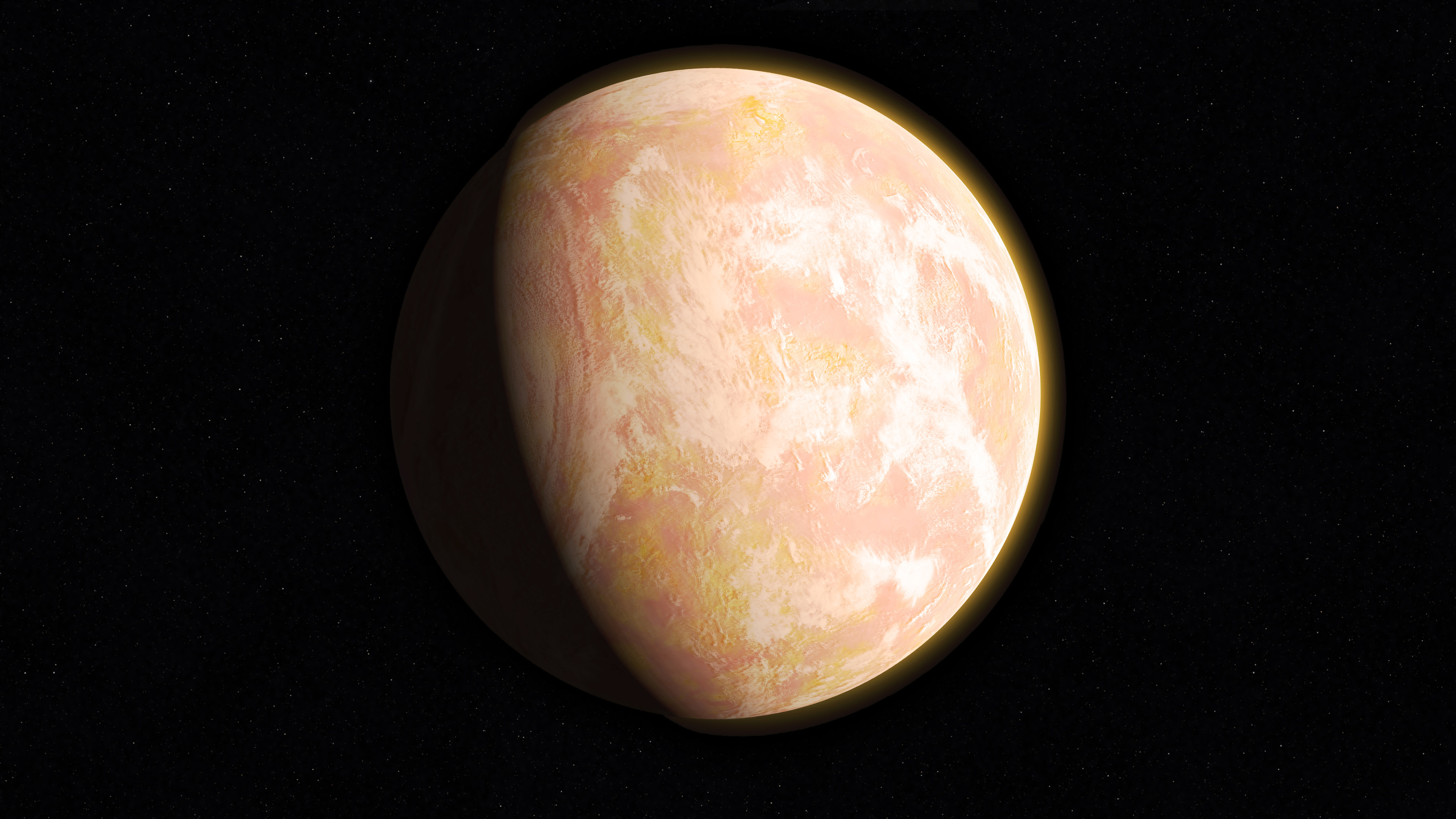
Artist's imagination of the Archean Earth with an orange-hazed secondary atmosphere, dubbed the "pale orange dot"

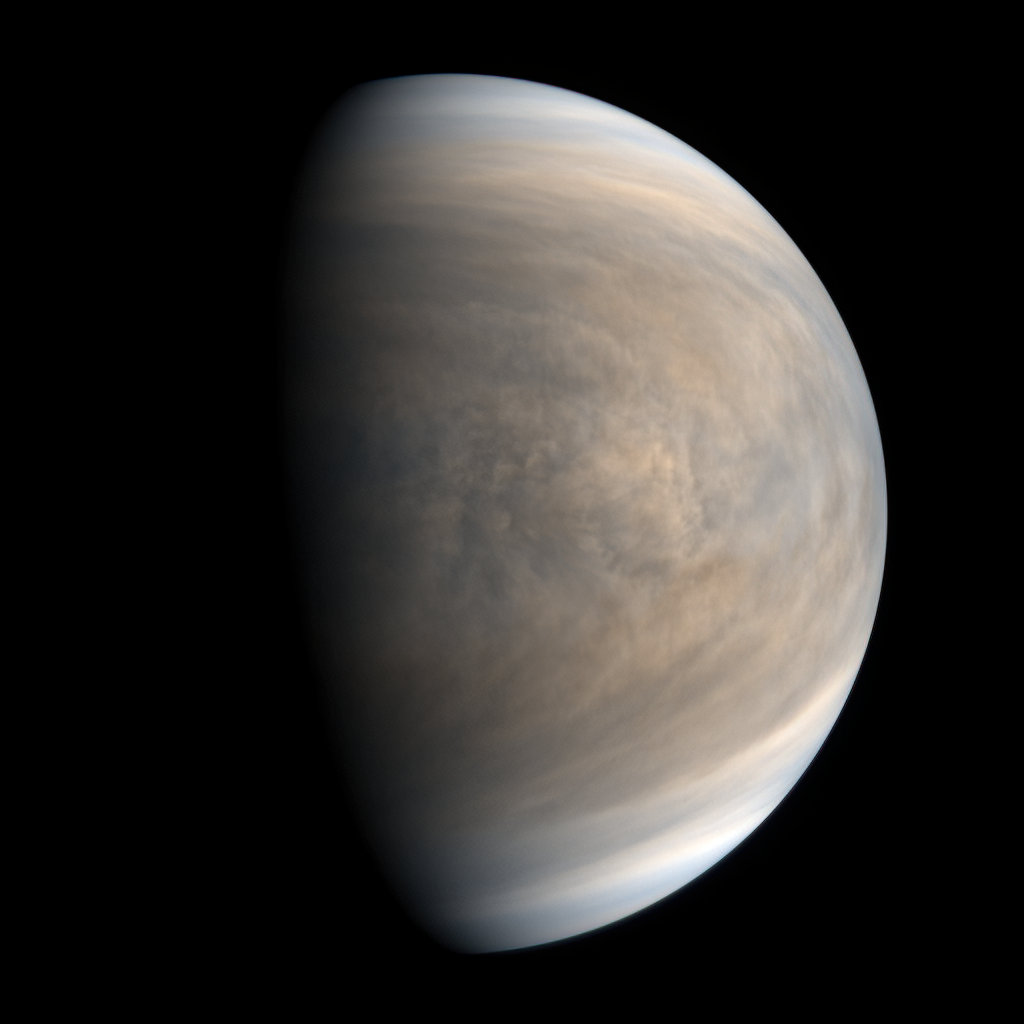
The CO_{2}-predominant (96.5%) secondary atmosphere of Venus, which is over 90 times denser than that of Earth

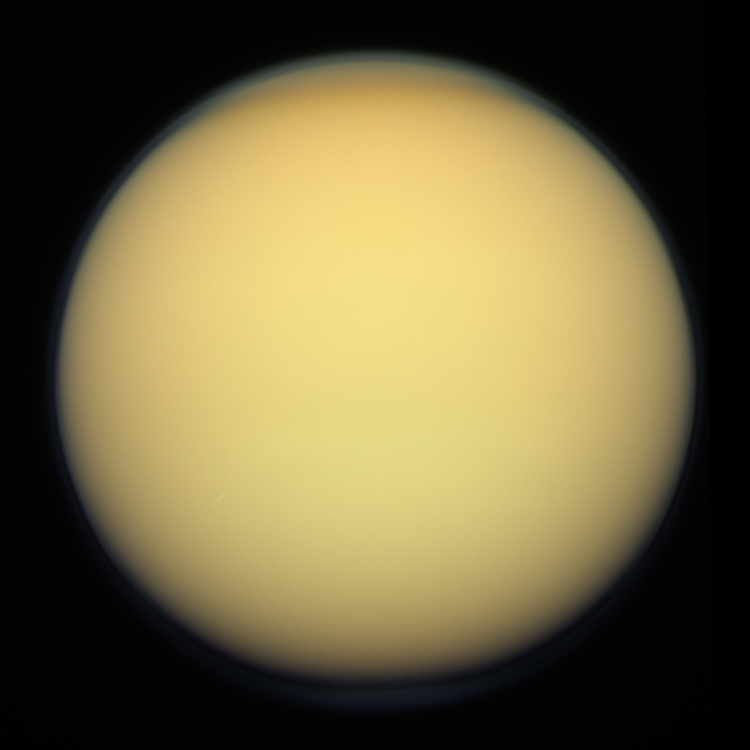
The nitrogen-predominant (94.2%) secondary atmosphere of Titan, the largest moon of Saturn, which is denser than Earth's atmosphere

A secondary atmosphere is a planetary atmosphere that did not form directly via accretion during the formation of the planetary system. It is characteristic of terrestrial planets such as the four planets of the Inner Solar System, i.e. Mercury, Venus, Earth (specifically Archean Earth) and Mars, as these planets typically are not massive enough for gravity to long-lastingly retain the compositions of their initial primary atmospheres.

When a protoplanet forms from coalescence of planetesimals, it begins to achieve sufficient mass to also accrete volatile gases from the protoplanetary disk, which envelope the planetary surface forming an atmosphere with primordial ("protosolar") compositions identical/similar to the original circumstellar disk, i.e. the primary atmosphere. Due to ongoing atmospheric escape, outgassing from internal volcanic activities, chemical reactions among the volatiles, and/or meteoric introduction of foreign volatiles from impact events with comets and asteroids, the primary atmosphere will experience gradual alterations to its compositions over time, and a secondary atmosphere forms when the accumulated alterations are significant enough.

The secondary atmospheres of terrestrial planets are relatively thin compared to their original primary atmosphere, and are significantly thinner than the contemporary atmospheres of gas giants like Jupiter and Saturn, which tend to retain their primary atmospheres. The atmospheres of ice giants such as Uranus and Neptune are similar to those of gas giants in hydrogen and helium proportions, but tend to be proportionally thinner than the gas giants and have much higher levels of atmospheric methane.

The current atmosphere of Earth, which is uniquely oxygen-rich (with a molar fraction of 20.9%), is actually not its secondary atmosphere, but rather a tertiary atmosphere that formed by further alterations to the secondary atmosphere, most notably by the appearance and evolution of biological life. The Earth's secondary atmosphere started to form during the Hadean eon after the Theia Impact, which caused partial ejection of the original primary atmosphere and was followed by significant outgassing through the post-impact molten mantle throughout the Hadean, and eventually significant foreign volatiles injection via a "late veneer" of extraterrestrial impactors at the end of the Hadean. With subsequent crustal cooling and solidification, the Early Earth's atmospheric temperature and pressure dropped to condense out most of the water vapor (which precipitated onto the surface forming a superocean), leaving a nitrogen/methane/CO_{2}-dominated reducing atmosphere during much of the Archean eon, i.e. the Earth's secondary atmosphere. However, when cyanobacteria evolved during the Mesoarchean, their chlorophyll-driven photosynthetic carbon fixation continuously released elemental dioxygen as a byproduct of water-splitting, eventually overwhelmed the Earth's surface reductant capabilities and led to the Great Oxygenation Event at the end of the Archean. With further radiation of photoautotrophs (cyanobacteria and their symbiogenetic relatives, i.e. algae and plants), the Archean secondary atmosphere (prebiotic atmosphere) had been transformed into the oxic tertiary atmosphere (which is an oxidizing atmosphere with significant biotic inputs within its circulation) during the Proterozoic and Phanerozoic eons.

== Atmosphere evolution ==
=== Starting point ===
During planet formation, gas and dust from the Sun's protoplanetary disc accrete onto all forming planets. Depending on the final size of the planet, it may or may not have enough gravity to retain this first, primary atmosphere or the star's solar winds strip the atmosphere off of the planet. The giant planets, such as Jupiter and Saturn, became large enough where they were able to hold onto their primary atmosphere that they gained during formation while terrestrial planets, such as Venus and Earth, do not have enough gravity to hold onto the original atmosphere. By being made of rock, they are able to go through geologic processes that will produce gas into the atmosphere.

=== Post-primary atmosphere ===
If the planet is too small, then its gravity isn't strong enough to hold onto all of the gas it gained during formation. This causes the primary atmosphere, which is mostly made of hydrogen (H_{2}) from the nebula the solar system formed in, to run away and leave the planet entirely. Hydrogen, being the lightest element, will naturally escape the atmosphere due to it being the most buoyant. If a planet is to gain a new atmosphere, it must create one with materials found within the planet itself.

Volcanism is an example of a geologic process that will pump out volcanic gasses, such as carbon dioxide (CO_{2}) and sulfur dioxide (SO_{2}), that come out from a variety of sources. During the hot protoplanet phase, the molten planet or moon will cool off which will cause the surface to solidify. Material still want to outgas which causes openings in the crust which will spew out gas that is often trapped in the cavities of rocks which include the asteroids, meteors, and comets that bombard the surface of a planet during, and after, its formation. The molten magma or lava is able to retain gasses that are dissolved or bonded with the magma or lava itself and release at the opening of the volcano where the pressure becomes low enough to sublimate.

Water (H_{2}O) is a very common molecule throughout the universe, so asteroids and comets during the solar system's formation were likely what brought water around the solar system. When the water is first delivered, it mixes in with the surrounding lava and stays trapped until it cools off enough. The volcanoes, along with the other gasses mentioned above, will also spew out water vapor that was trapped in the magma. In the case of Earth, its earliest secondary atmosphere was almost entirely made up of water vapor and carbon dioxide.

=== Planetary conditions ===
How a planet forms a secondary atmosphere once the primary atmospheric compositions are lost is heavily dependent on the planet's astrogeological conditions as well as its orbital conditions within the planetary system. Different types of stars have varying amounts of emitted irradiance and solar wind, which are the main exogenous factors that tend to erode a planet's atmosphere via thermal and suprathermal escapes. For example, Mercury does not have an atmosphere because it is so close to the Sun, that solar winds have long stripped off its atmosphere. Exoplanets such as HD 209458 b, TOI-849 b and possibly CoRoT-7b are suspected to be chthonian planets, which are former gas giants in close proximity to their home stars (a.k.a. "hot Jupiters") that thus have their atmospheres baked away, leaving just exposed solid cores that resemble terrestrial planets. Impact events with other celestial bodies such as asteroids, comets and minor planets (e.g. the Theia Impact) will cause both bulk volatiles injection and ejection (impact erosion) to the existing atmosphere. Endogenous factors such as geothermal activities (volcanism, fumeroles, hydrothermal vents, cryovolcanoes, etc.) will cause both outgassing, which adds compositions (e.g. helium, nitrogen, methane and CO_{2}) into the atmosphere; and enhanced weathering, which absorbs and removes compositions (most notably CO_{2}) from the atmosphere.

In the case of the Earth's atmosphere, its primary atmosphere started transforming into a secondary atmosphere quite early on (merely about 100 million years after the Solar System's formation) despite a faint young Sun, accelerated by the giant impact with a co-orbital protoplanet named Theia, which not only impact-eroded large amount of atmospheric volatiles during the collision but also fractured and partly avulsed the Earth's original molten crust, causing the Earth to remain largely an outgassing lava planet throughout the Hadean eon. This was further compounded by the Late Heavy Bombardment until the crust finally achieved long-term solidification around 3.8 Ga. The moderate location of Earth's orbit within the habitable zone, as well as its magnetic field capable of deflecting away most of the ionizing solar winds, allowed a stable, reducing, nitrogen-dominant secondary atmosphere with sufficient greenhouse effect (due to abundant methane and CO_{2}) for a likely temperate paleoclimate and active hydrological cycles during the Archean eon.

== See also ==
- Primary atmosphere
- Paleoatmosphere
- Prebiotic atmosphere
- Reducing atmosphere
- Great Oxygenation Event
