= Origin of air =

Origin of air may refer to:

- Geological history of oxygen
- Great Oxygenation Event
