= Geological history of oxygen =

O_{2} build-up in the Earth's atmosphere. Red and green lines represent the range of the estimates while time is measured in billions of years ago (Ga). Stage 1 (3.85–2.45 Ga): Practically no O_{2} in the atmosphere. Stage 2 (2.45–1.85 Ga): O_{2} produced, but absorbed in oceans and seabed rock. Stage 3 (1.85–0.85 Ga): O_{2} starts to gas out of the oceans, but is absorbed by land surfaces and formation of ozone layer. Stages 4 and 5 (0.85 Ga–present): O_{2} sinks filled, the gas accumulates.

Although oxygen is the most abundant element in Earth's crust, due to its high reactivity it mostly exists in compound (oxide) forms such as water, carbon dioxide, iron oxides and silicates. Before photosynthesis evolved, Earth's atmosphere and ancient superocean had little free elemental diatomic oxygen (O_{2}). Small quantities of oxygen were released by geological processes, but did not build up in the prebiotic atmosphere due to reactions with then-abundant reducing gases such as atmospheric methane and hydrogen sulfide and surface reductants such as ferrous iron and sulfur.

Photoautotrophs capable of oxygenic photosynthesis appeared during the Mesoarchean era, and over the course of the next billion years began releasing oxygen into the ocean. Eventually, the accumulated oxygen production overwhelmed the total reducing capacity of the Earth's surface — the ocean first, then the atmosphere — and free oxygen began building up in the atmosphere at approximately 2.45 Ga during the Neoarchean-Paleoproterozoic boundary. This led to a fundamental and irreversible transition of the Earth's atmosphere from a previously reducing secondary atmosphere to an oxidizing tertiary atmosphere, a paleogeological event known as the Great Oxygenation Event (GOE), which also led to a global icehouse known as the Huronian glaciation and the deposition of oxidized banded iron formations during the early Proterozoic. The concentrations of O_{2} attained were less than 0.1% of present atmospheric level and probably fluctuated greatly. Starting 550-850Mya a second event known as the Neoproterozoic Oxygenation Event lead to oxygen levels similar or even higher than the present. The increase in oxygen concentrations had wide-ranging and significant impacts on Earth's geochemistry and biosphere. Detailed connections between oxygen and evolution remain elusive.

== Importance ==
Oxygen is both a product and a key enabler of biological activity. Photosynthesis by chlorophyll-bearing autotrophs (cyanobacteria and their endosymbiont descendants in algae and plant plastids) releases oxygen as byproduct of water splitting for carbon fixation, while all eukaryotes (animals, plants, fungi and protists) rely on the consumption of oxygen for metabolism via aerobic respiration. Consequently the evolution of life is closely related to the concentration of available free oxygen. Understanding the relationship between oxygen and evolution would aid in seeking evidence of extraterrestrial life in exoplanet data. Oxygen concentration plays a key role in the geochemical composition of sedimentary rocks, making oxygen concentration important for geology and sedimentary rocks important for understanding oxygen concentration over geologic time.

== Overview ==
Due to limitations in measurements, oxygen concentration in the atmosphere or oceans over much of the early parts of Earth's history remains controversial. The consensus view includes these phases:

- Earth's atmosphere was initially oxygen free.
- During the Great Oxidation Event at the Neoarchean–Paleoproterozoic boundary, free oxygen first appeared in low concentrations, around 2.0-2.5 Gya.
- A second rise during the early Neoproterozoic called Neoproterozoic Oxygenation Event, oxygen concentration rise above 1% (5% PAL) for the first time, occurred around 550-850 Mya.
- A third rise during the mid-Paleozoic, oxygen rise to and above modern level, coinciding with rapid land expansion of vascular plants, occurred around 428 to 359 Mya.
- Eruption of the Siberian Traps led to the Permian–Triassic extinction event that devastated terrestrial florae, oxygen level falls from 30% to below 15% (143% to 71% PAL), occurred around 252 Ma.
- Terrestrial florae gradually recovered throughout the Triassic, oxygen level rose to above modern levels during the Jurassic and Cretaceous.
- Impact winter from Cretaceous–Paleogene extinction event (66 Ma) again disrupted terrestrial florae, oxygen fluctuated more steadily between 15% and 25% of the atmosphere throughout the Cenozoic.
- Today the atmosphere is approximately 21% oxygen, currently in an interglacial period within the larger Quaternary glaciation.

The timing and character of the oxygenation events have been the subject of many discussions.

== Paleo-oxybarometers ==
Techniques for estimating oxygen at different times in the past are called "paleo-oxybarometers". An ideal technique would rely on trapped gas or fluid in a well-dated rock layer, but such examples are scarce. Most measurements are indirect analysis of oxidation in sedimentary rocks to infer oxygen in ancient atmosphere or oceans. Ocean analysis is especially challenging because tectonic subduction replaces the ocean floor every 200 million years. Many new techniques have been developed but their analysis and comparison have led to additional debates rather than consensus on the oxygen history of Earth.

== Prebiotic atmosphere ==
Earth's early atmosphere had a very low concentration of oxygen, probably less than 0.001% of present day levels. While details are not well known, measurements of mass-independent fractionation of sulfur in sedimentary sulphides and sulfates rule out significant oxygen before around 2.45Gya. Continuing sources of oxygen during this period would have been photodissociation of water followed by escape of the hydrogen product or of sulfur dioxide.

== Major oxygenation events ==
=== Great Oxygenation Event ===
Between 2.45 and 2 Gya, oxygen began to build up in the atmosphere. This time coincided with major changes in geochemistry and biology on the Earth but which changes are causes and which are results are debated. Widespread production of oxygen by cyanobacteria which evolved around this time is suggestive, but substantial evidence suggests that cyanobacteria appeared at least 2.7Ga and perhaps well before that. Geological effects like volcanism, weathering, and burial of chemically altered rocks may be important. Oxygen began to persist in the atmosphere in small quantities about 50 million years before the start of the Great Oxygenation Event.

=== Neoproterozoic Oxygenation Event ===
After the Great Oxygenation Event, the Earth entered a long period of euxinia known as the Boring Billion.} Although the atmosphere had become oxidative with the presence of free oxygen, the oxygen level was still very low (<0.1% PAL) in both the atmosphere and the ocean. However, by 800 Mya during the Neoproterozoic, oxygen in the atmosphere was between 1% and 18% of the present atmospheric level, and oxygen levels began to rise more significantly by around 600 Mya. This "Second Great Oxygenation Event" has been reported to be associated with the evolution of nitrogen fixation in cyanobacteria, or the rise of more robust eukaryotic photoautotrophs (i.e. algae) via endosymbiosis and increased phosphorus removal from the ocean. The atmospheric concentration rose to >13% PAL during the early Tonian from 900 to 815 Ma, and possibly up to ~50% PAL during the Sturtian–Marinoan interglacial in the Cryogenian. This rise in oxygen, which continued after the Snowball Earth event of the Cryogenian, set the conditions that allowed an early radiation of mostly sessile primitive animals during the subsequent Ediacaran period (known as the Avalon Explosion) and later also the more significant radiation of eumetazoan animals during the Cambrian period (i.e. the Cambrian Explosion).

=== Paleozoic Oxygenation Event ===
The Paleozoic Oxygenation Event (POE) was a well-defined, stepwise increase of oxygen in Earth's atmosphere during the mid-Paleozoic, coinciding with the terrestrial evolutionary radiation of vascular plant during the late Silurian and early Devonian, i.e. the so-called Silurian–Devonian Terrestrial Revolution. This was likely a direct result of increased photosynthetic yield by the expanding terrestrial florae, since land photoautotrophs inherently receive more direct sunlight while aquatic autotrophs experience reflective and attenuative losses through water; and terrestrial florae has access to higher concentration of free carbon dioxide than aquatic florae (around 400 ppm in current atmosphere, as opposed to around 10 ppm dissolved in most surface waters). Prior to the advent of land plants, atmospheric O_{2} concentration oscillated between about 2% and 11% of the current standard atmospheric level (atm) during the Cambrian to mid-Ordovician and around 13% atm during early Silurian, but rose significantly to near modern-day levels (1 atm, about 21% mole fraction) in the Devonian and subsequently to a peak of over 1.6 atm (around 35% mole fraction) during the late Carboniferous and most of the Permian periods.

Increased atmospheric oxygenation also led to increased spontaneous wildfires, and the Earth's atmosphere first became sufficiently high in oxygen to produce wildfires during the Pridoli Epoch of the late Silurian, where the first charcoal evidence of wildfires is noted in the fossil record. For most of the Early and Middle Devonian, the atmosphere was insufficiently oxygenated to enable significant fire activity. By the late Famennian, however, oxygen levels were high enough to enable wildfires to occur with regularity and on large scales, something which had not been previously possible due to the paucity of atmospheric oxygen.

== Evolution and oxygen ==
Life timeline
← / Earth formed; ← / Earliest water; ← / LUCA; ← / Earliest fossils; ← / Great Oxygenation Event; ← / Sexual reproduction; ← / Earliest fungi; ← / Neoproterozoic oxygenation event; ← / Ediacaran biota; ← / Cambrian explosion; ← / Earliest tetrapods; ← / Earliest hominoid
(million years ago)

Atmospheric oxygen is the most conspicuous sign of life on Earth. The evolution of photosynthesis and the rise of oxygen-producing cyanobacteria are major events in evolution. Photosynthetic oxygen eventually accumulated in the atmosphere, transforming both the surface of the planet and the nature of life

Despite these connections, the details are not simple. The evolution of life and the geological history of oxygen share many similar patterns, but the relationship between these two histories remains uncertain. For example, the rise in oxygen concencentration and the rise the maximum size of organism have similar histories, but evidence that oxygen concentration limits size is inconclusive. As more evidence for lower and variable levels of oxygen before the Neoproterozoic has emerged, simple relationships between life and oxygen have been harder to justify.

== See also ==
- Great Oxidation Event
- Neoproterozoic oxygenation event
- Silurian-Devonian Terrestrial Revolution
