= Paleoclimatology =

Study of changes in ancient climate

Paleoclimatology (British spelling, palaeoclimatology) is the scientific study of climates predating the invention of meteorological instruments, when no direct, artificial measurement data were available. As instrumental records only span a tiny part of Earth's history, the reconstruction of ancient climate is important to understand natural variation and the evolution of the current climate.

Paleoclimatology uses a variety of proxy methods from Earth and life sciences to obtain data previously preserved within rocks, sediments, boreholes, ice sheets, tree rings, corals, shells, and microfossils. Combined with techniques to date the proxies, the paleoclimate records are used to determine the past states of Earth's atmosphere.

The scientific field of paleoclimatology came to maturity in the 20th century. Notable periods studied by paleoclimatologists include the frequent glaciations that Earth has undergone, rapid cooling events like the Younger Dryas, and the rapid warming during the Paleocene–Eocene Thermal Maximum. Studies of past changes in the environment and biodiversity often reflect on the current situation, specifically the impact of climate on mass extinctions and biotic recovery and current global warming.

Studying paleoclimatology is important when looking towards the Earth's future regarding climate specifically.

== History ==
Notions of a changing climate most likely evolved in ancient Egypt, Mesopotamia, the Indus Valley and China, where prolonged periods of droughts and floods were experienced. In the seventeenth century, Robert Hooke postulated that fossils of giant turtles found in Dorset could only be explained by a once warmer climate, which he thought could be explained by a shift in Earth's axis. Fossils were, at that time, often explained as a consequence of a biblical flood. Systematic observations of sunspots started by amateur astronomer Heinrich Schwabe in the early 19th century, starting a discussion of the Sun's influence on Earth's climate.

The scientific study of paleoclimatology began to take shape in the early 19th century, when discoveries about glaciations and natural changes in Earth's past climate helped to understand the greenhouse effect. It was only in the 20th century that paleoclimatology became a unified scientific field. Before, different aspects of Earth's climate history were studied by a variety of disciplines. At the end of the 20th century, the empirical research into Earth's ancient climates started to be combined with computer models of increasing complexity. A new objective also developed in this period: finding ancient analog climates that could provide information about current climate change.

== Reconstructing ancient climates ==
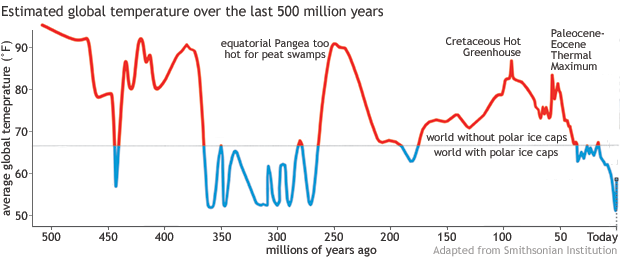
Preliminary results from a Smithsonian Institution project, showing Earth's average surface temperature over the past 500 million years

Palaeotemperature graphs placed together

The oxygen content in the atmosphere over the last billion years

Paleoclimatologists employ a wide variety of techniques to deduce ancient climates. The techniques used depend on which variable has to be reconstructed (this could be temperature, precipitation, or something else) and how long ago the climate of interest occurred. For instance, the deep marine record, the source of most isotopic data, exists only on oceanic plates, which are eventually subducted; the oldest remaining material is 200 million years old. Older sediments are also more prone to corruption by diagenesis. This is due to the millions of years of disruption experienced by the rock formations, such as pressure, tectonic activity, and fluid flowing. These factors often result in a lack of quality or quantity of data, which causes resolution and confidence in the data to decrease over time.

Specific techniques used to make inferences on ancient climate conditions are the use of lake sediment cores and speleothems. These utilize an analysis of sediment layers and rock growth formations respectively, amongst element-dating methods utilizing oxygen, carbon and uranium.

=== Proxies for climate ===
==== Direct quantitative measurements ====
The direct quantitative measurements method is the most direct approach to understand the change in a climate. Comparisons between recent data and older data allow a researcher to gain a basic understanding of weather and climate changes within an area. There is a disadvantage to this method. Data on the climate only started being recorded in the mid-1800s. This means that researchers can only utilize 150 years of data. That is not helpful when trying to map the climate of an area 10,000 years ago. This is where more complex methods can be used.

==== Ice ====
Mountain glaciers and the polar ice caps/ice sheets provide much data in paleoclimatology. Ice-coring projects in the ice caps of Greenland and Antarctica have yielded data going back several hundred thousand years, over 800,000 years in the case of the EPICA project.

- Air trapped within fallen snow becomes encased in tiny bubbles as the snow is compressed into ice in the glacier under the weight of later years' snow. The trapped air has proven a tremendously valuable source for direct measurement of the composition of air from the time the ice was formed.
- Layering can be observed because of seasonal pauses in ice accumulation and can be used to establish chronology, associating specific depths of the core with ranges of time.
- Changes in the layering thickness can be used to determine changes in precipitation or temperature.
- Oxygen-18 quantity changes (δ^{18}O) in ice layers represent changes in average ocean surface temperature. Water molecules containing the heavier O-18 evaporate at a higher temperature than water molecules containing the normal Oxygen-16 isotope. The ratio of O-18 to O-16 will be higher as temperature increases but it also depends on factors such as water salinity and the volume of water locked up in ice sheets. Various cycles in isotope ratios have been detected.
- Pollen has been observed in the ice cores and can be used to understand which plants were present as the layer formed. Pollen is produced in abundance and its distribution is typically well understood. A pollen count for a specific layer can be produced by observing the total amount of pollen categorized by type (shape) in a controlled sample of that layer. Changes in plant frequency over time can be plotted through statistical analysis of pollen counts in the core. Knowing which plants were present leads to an understanding of precipitation and temperature, and types of fauna present. Palynology includes the study of pollen for these purposes.
- Volcanic ash is contained in some layers and can be used to establish the time of the layer's formation. Volcanic events distribute ash with a unique set of properties (shape and color of particles, chemical signature). Establishing the ash's source will give a time period to associate with the layer of ice.

A multinational consortium, the European Project for Ice Coring in Antarctica (EPICA), has drilled an ice core in Dome C on the East Antarctic ice sheet and retrieved ice from roughly 800,000 years ago. The international ice core community has, under the auspices of International Partnerships in Ice Core Sciences (IPICS), defined a priority project to obtain the oldest possible ice core record from Antarctica, an ice core record reaching back to or towards 1.5 million years ago.

==== Dendroclimatology ====
Climatic information can be obtained through an understanding of changes in tree growth. Generally, trees respond to changes in climatic variables by speeding up or slowing down growth, which in turn is generally reflected by a greater or lesser thickness in growth rings. Different species, however, respond to changes in climatic variables in different ways. A tree-ring record is established by compiling information from many living trees in a specific area. This is done by comparing the number, thickness, ring boundaries, and pattern matching of tree growth rings.

The differences in thickness displayed in the growth rings in trees can often indicate the quality of conditions in the environment, and the fitness of the tree species evaluated. Different species of trees will display different growth responses to the changes in the climate. An evaluation of multiple trees within the same species, along with one tree in a different species, will allow for a more accurate analysis of the changing variables within the climate and how they affected the surrounding species.

Older intact wood that has escaped decay can extend the time covered by the record by matching the ring depth changes to contemporary specimens. By using that method, some areas have tree-ring records dating back a few thousand years. Older wood not connected to a contemporary record can be dated generally with radiocarbon techniques. A tree-ring record can be used to produce information regarding precipitation, temperature, hydrology, and fire corresponding to a particular area.

==== Sedimentary content ====
On a longer time scale, geologists must refer to the sedimentary record for data.

- Sediments, sometimes lithified to form rock, may contain remnants of preserved vegetation, animals, plankton, or pollen, which may be characteristic of certain climatic zones.
- Biomarker molecules such as the alkenones may yield information about their temperature of formation.
- Chemical signatures, particularly the Mg/Ca ratio of calcite in Foraminifera tests, can be used to reconstruct past temperature.
- Isotopic ratios can provide further information. Specifically, the δ^{18}O record responds to changes in temperature and ice volume, and the δ^{13}C record reflects a range of factors, which are often difficult to disentangle.

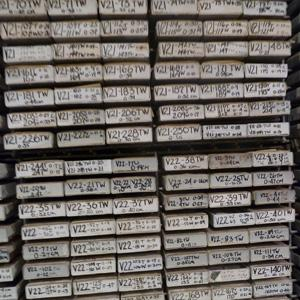
Sea floor core sample labelled to identify the exact spot on the sea floor where the sample was taken. Sediments from nearby locations can show significant differences in chemical and biological composition.

Sedimentary facies

On a longer time scale, the rock record may show signs of sea level rise and fall, and features such as "fossilised" sand dunes can be identified. Scientists can get a grasp of long-term climate by studying sedimentary rock going back billions of years. The division of Earth history into separate periods is largely based on visible changes in sedimentary rock layers that demarcate major changes in conditions. Often, they include major shifts in climate.

==== Sclerochronology ====
Corals (see also Sclerochronology)

Coral "rings'' share similar evidence of growth to that of trees and thus can be dated in similar ways. A primary difference is their environments and the conditions within those that they respond to. Examples of these conditions for coral include water temperature, freshwater influx, changes in pH, and wave disturbances. From there, specialized equipment, such as the Advanced Very High-Resolution Radiometer (AVHRR) instrument, can be used to derive the sea surface temperature and water salinity from the past few centuries. The δ^{18}O of coralline red algae provides a useful proxy of the combined sea surface temperature and sea surface salinity at high latitudes and the tropics, where many traditional techniques are limited.

==== Landscapes and landforms ====
Within climatic geomorphology, one approach is to study relict landforms to infer ancient climates. Being often concerned about past climates climatic geomorphology is considered sometimes to be a theme of historical geology. Evidence of these past climates to be studied can be found in the landforms they leave behind. Examples of these landforms are those such as glacial landforms (moraines, striations), desert features (dunes, desert pavements), and coastal landforms (marine terraces, beach ridges). Climatic geomorphology is of limited use to study recent (Quaternary, Holocene) large climate changes since there are seldom discernible in the geomorphological record.

=== Timing of proxies ===
The field of geochronology has scientists working on determining how old certain proxies are. For recent proxy archives of tree rings and corals the individual year rings can be counted, and an exact year can be determined. Radiometric dating uses the properties of radioactive elements in proxies. In older material, more of the radioactive material will have decayed and the proportion of different elements will be different from newer proxies. One example of radiometric dating is radiocarbon dating. In the air, cosmic rays constantly convert nitrogen into a specific radioactive carbon isotope, ^{14}C. When plants then use this carbon to grow, this isotope is not replenished anymore and starts decaying. The proportion of 'normal' carbon and Carbon-14 gives information about how long the plant material has not been in contact with the atmosphere.

== Notable climate events in Earth history ==
VOA report about indications of climate change in fossils from the La Brea Tar Pits

Knowledge of precise climatic events decreases as the record goes back in time, but some notable climate events are known:

- Faint young Sun paradox (start)
- Huronian glaciation (~2400 Mya Earth completely covered in ice probably due to Great Oxygenation Event)
- Later Neoproterozoic Snowball Earth (~600 Mya, precursor to the Cambrian Explosion)
- Andean-Saharan glaciation (~450 Mya)
- Carboniferous Rainforest Collapse (~300 Mya)
- Permian–Triassic extinction event (251.9 Mya)
- Oceanic anoxic events (~120 Mya, 93 Mya, and others)
- Cretaceous–Paleogene extinction event (66 Mya)
- Paleocene–Eocene Thermal Maximum (Paleocene–Eocene, 55Mya)
- Last Glacial Maximum (~23,000 BCE)
- Younger Dryas/Big Freeze (~11,000 BCE)
- Holocene climatic optimum (~7000–3000 BCE)
- Extreme weather events of 535–536 (535–536 CE)
- Medieval Warm Period (900–1300)
- Little Ice Age (1300–1800)
- Year Without a Summer (1816)

== History of the atmosphere ==
Life timeline
← / Earth formed; ← / Earliest water; ← / LUCA; ← / Earliest fossils; ← / Atmospheric oxygen; ← / Sexual reproduction; ← / Earliest fungi; ← / Neoproterozoic oxygenation event; ← / Ediacaran biota; ← / Cambrian explosion; ← / Earliest tetrapods; ← / Earliest hominoid
(million years ago)

=== Earliest atmosphere ===
The first atmosphere would have consisted of gases in the solar nebula, primarily hydrogen. In addition, there would probably have been simple hydrides such as those now found in gas giants like Jupiter and Saturn, notably water vapor, methane, and ammonia. As the solar nebula dissipated, the gases would have escaped, partly driven off by the solar wind.

=== Second atmosphere ===
The next atmosphere, consisting largely of nitrogen, carbon dioxide, and inert gases, was produced by outgassing from volcanism, supplemented by gases produced during the Late Heavy Bombardment of Earth by huge asteroids. A major part of carbon dioxide emissions were soon dissolved in water and built up carbonate sediments.

Water-related sediments have been found dating from as early as 3.8 billion years ago. About 3.4 billion years ago, nitrogen was the major part of the then stable "second atmosphere". An influence of life has to be taken into account rather soon in the history of the atmosphere because hints of early life forms have been dated to as early as 3.5 to 4.3 billion years ago. The fact that it is not perfectly in line with the 30% lower solar radiance (compared to today) of the early Sun has been described as the "faint young Sun paradox".

The geological record, however, shows a continually relatively warm surface during the complete early temperature record of Earth with the exception of one cold glacial phase about 2.4 billion years ago. In the late Archaean eon, an oxygen-containing atmosphere began to develop, apparently from photosynthesizing cyanobacteria (see Great Oxygenation Event) which have been found as stromatolite fossils from 2.7 billion years ago. The early basic carbon isotope (isotope ratio proportions) was very much in line with what is found today, suggesting that the fundamental features of the carbon cycle were established as early as 4 billion years ago.

=== Third atmosphere ===
The constant rearrangement of continents by plate tectonics influences the long-term evolution of the atmosphere by transferring carbon dioxide to and from large continental carbonate stores. Free oxygen did not exist in the atmosphere until about 2.4 billion years ago, during the Great Oxygenation Event, and its appearance is indicated by the end of the banded iron formations. Until then, any oxygen produced by photosynthesis was consumed by oxidation of reduced materials, notably iron. Molecules of free oxygen did not start to accumulate in the atmosphere until the rate of production of oxygen began to exceed the availability of reducing materials. That point was a shift from a reducing atmosphere to an oxidizing atmosphere. O_{2} showed major variations until reaching a steady state of more than 15% by the end of the Precambrian. The following time span was the Phanerozoic eon, during which oxygen-breathing metazoan life forms began to appear.

The amount of oxygen in the atmosphere has fluctuated over the last 600 million years, reaching a peak of 35% during the Carboniferous period, significantly higher than today's 21%. Two main processes govern changes in the atmosphere: plants use carbon dioxide from the atmosphere, releasing oxygen and the breakdown of pyrite and volcanic eruptions release sulfur into the atmosphere, which oxidizes and hence reduces the amount of oxygen in the atmosphere. However, volcanic eruptions also release carbon dioxide, which plants can convert to oxygen. The exact cause of the variation of the amount of oxygen in the atmosphere is not known. Periods with much oxygen in the atmosphere are associated with rapid development of animals. Today's atmosphere contains 21% oxygen, which is high enough for rapid development of animals.

== Climate during geological ages ==
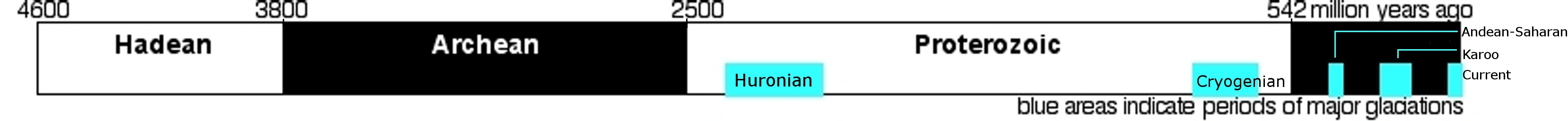
Timeline of glaciations, shown in blue

- The Huronian glaciation is the first known glaciation in Earth's history, and lasted from 2400 to 2100 million years ago.
- The Cryogenian glaciation lasted from 720 to 635 million years ago.
- The Andean-Saharan glaciation lasted from 450 to 420 million years ago.
- The Karoo glaciation lasted from 360 to 260 million years ago.
- The Quaternary glaciation is the current glaciation period and began 2.58 million years ago.

In 2020 scientists published a continuous, high-fidelity record of variations in Earth's climate during the past 66 million years and identified four climate states, separated by transitions that include changing greenhouse gas levels and polar ice sheet volumes. They integrated data from various sources. The warmest climate state since the time of the dinosaur extinction, "Hothouse", endured from 56 Mya to 47 Mya and was ~14 °C warmer than average modern temperatures.

=== Precambrian climate ===
The Precambrian took place between the time when Earth first formed 4.6 billion years (Ga) ago, and 542 million years ago. The Precambrian can be split into two eons, the Archean and the Proterozoic, which can be further subdivided into eras. The reconstruction of the Precambrian climate is difficult for various reasons including the low number of reliable indicators and a, generally, not well-preserved or extensive fossil record (especially when compared to the Phanerozoic eon). Despite these issues, there is evidence for a number of major climate events throughout the history of the Precambrian: The Great Oxygenation Event, which started around 2.3 Ga ago (the beginning of the Proterozoic) is indicated by biomarkers which demonstrate the appearance of photosynthetic organisms. Due to the high levels of oxygen in the atmosphere from the GOE, CH_{4} levels fell rapidly cooling the atmosphere and causing the Huronian glaciation. For about 1 Ga after the glaciation (2–0.8 Ga ago), Earth likely experienced warmer temperatures indicated by microfossils of photosynthetic eukaryotes, and oxygen levels between 5 and 18% of Earth's current oxygen level. At the end of the Proterozoic, there is evidence of global glaciation events of varying severity causing a 'Snowball Earth'. Snowball Earth is supported by different indicators such as, glacial deposits, significant continental erosion called the Great Unconformity, and sedimentary rocks called cap carbonates that form after a deglaciation episode.

=== Phanerozoic climate ===
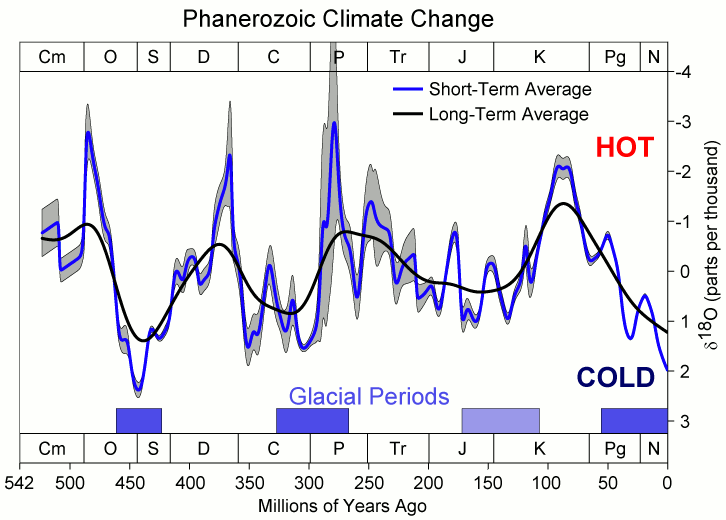
Changes in oxygen-18 ratios over the last 500 million years, indicating environmental change

Major drivers of the preindustrial ages have been variations of the Sun, volcanic ashes and exhalations, relative movements of the Earth towards the Sun, and tectonically induced effects such as major sea currents, watersheds, and ocean oscillations. In the early Phanerozoic, increased atmospheric carbon dioxide concentrations have been linked to driving or amplifying increased global temperatures. Royer et al. 2004 found a climate sensitivity for the rest of the Phanerozoic which was calculated to be similar to today's modern range of values.

The difference in global mean temperatures between a fully glacial Earth and an ice-free Earth is estimated at 10 °C, though far larger changes would be observed at high latitudes and smaller ones at low latitudes. One requirement for the development of large-scale ice sheets seems to be the arrangement of continental land masses at or near the poles. The constant rearrangement of continents by plate tectonics can also shape long-term climate evolution. However, the presence or absence of land masses at the poles is not sufficient to guarantee glaciations or exclude polar ice caps. Evidence exists of past warm periods in Earth's climate when polar land masses similar to Antarctica were home to deciduous forests rather than ice sheets.

The relatively warm local minimum between Jurassic and Cretaceous goes along with an increase of subduction and mid-ocean ridge volcanism due to the breakup of the Pangea supercontinent.

Superimposed on the long-term evolution between hot and cold climates have been many short-term fluctuations in climate similar to, and sometimes more severe than, the varying glacial and interglacial states of the present ice age. Some of the most severe fluctuations, such as the Paleocene-Eocene Thermal Maximum, may be related to rapid climate changes due to sudden collapses of natural methane clathrate reservoirs in the oceans.

A similar, single event of induced severe climate change after a meteorite impact has been proposed as a reason for the Cretaceous–Paleogene extinction event. Other major thresholds include the Permian-Triassic and Ordovician-Silurian extinction events with various reasons suggested.

=== Quaternary climate ===
Ice core data for the past 800,000 years (x-axis values represent "age before 1950", so today's date is on the left side of the graph and older time on the right). Blue curve is temperature, red curve is atmospheric CO_{2} concentrations, and brown curve is dust fluxes. Note length of glacial-interglacial cycles averages ~100,000 years.

Holocene temperature variations

The Quaternary geological period includes the current climate. There has been a cycle of ice ages for the past 2.2–2.1 million years (starting before the Quaternary in the late Neogene Period).

Note in the graphic on the right the strong 120,000-year periodicity of the cycles, and the striking asymmetry of the curves. This asymmetry is believed to result from complex interactions of feedback mechanisms. It has been observed that ice ages deepen by progressive steps, but the recovery to interglacial conditions occurs in one big step.

The graph on the left shows the temperature change over the past 12,000 years, from various sources; the thick black curve is an average.

== Climate forcings ==
Climate forcing is the difference between radiant energy (sunlight) received by the Earth and the outgoing longwave radiation back to space. Such radiative forcing is quantified based on the CO_{2} amount in the tropopause, in units of watts per square meter at the Earth's surface. Dependent on the radiative balance of incoming and outgoing energy, the Earth either warms up or cools down. Earth's radiative balance originates from changes in solar insolation and the concentrations of greenhouse gases and aerosols. Climate change may be due to internal processes in Earth's spheres and/or external forcings.

One example of a way this can be applied to study climatology is analyzing how varying concentrations of CO_{2} affect the overall climate. This is done by using various proxies to estimate past greenhouse gas concentrations and compare those to those of the present day. Researchers can then assess their role in the progression of climate change throughout Earth's history.

=== Internal processes and forcings ===
The Earth's climate system involves the atmosphere, biosphere, cryosphere, hydrosphere, and lithosphere, and the sum of these processes from Earth's spheres is what affects the climate. Greenhouse gasses act as the internal forcing of the climate system. Particular interests in climate science and paleoclimatology focus on the study of Earth climate sensitivity in response to the sum of forcings. Analyzing the sum of these forcings contributes to the ability of scientists to make broad conclusive estimates on the Earth's climate system. These estimates include the evidence for systems such as long-term climate variability (eccentricity, obliquity precession), feedback mechanisms (Ice-Albedo Effect), and anthropogenic influence.

Examples:

- Thermohaline circulation (Hydrosphere)
- Life (Biosphere)

=== External forcings ===
- The Milankovitch cycles determine Earth's distance and position to the Sun. The solar insolation is the total amount of solar radiation received by Earth.
- Volcanic eruptions are considered an external forcing.
- Human changes of the composition of the atmosphere or land use.
- Human activities causing anthropogenic greenhouse gas emissions leading to global warming and associated climate changes.
- Large asteroids that have cataclysmic impacts on Earth's climate are considered external forcings.

=== Mechanisms ===
On timescales of millions of years, the uplift of mountain ranges and subsequent weathering processes of rocks and soils and the subduction of tectonic plates are an important part of the carbon cycle. The weathering sequesters CO_{2}, by the reaction of minerals with chemicals (especially silicate weathering with CO_{2}) and thereby removing CO_{2} from the atmosphere and reducing the radiative forcing. The opposite effect is volcanism, responsible for the natural greenhouse effect by emitting CO_{2} into the atmosphere, thus affecting glaciation (Ice Age) cycles. Jim Hansen suggested that humans emit CO_{2} 10,000 times faster than natural processes have done in the past.

Ice sheet dynamics and continental positions (and linked vegetation changes) have been important factors in the long-term evolution of Earth's climate. There is also a close correlation between CO_{2} and temperature, where CO_{2} has a strong control over global temperatures in Earth's history.

== See also ==
- Cyclostratigraphy – Study of astronomically forced climate cycles within sedimentary successions
- Paleoatmosphere – Ancient atmosphere, particularly of Earth, in the geological past
- Paleoceanography – Study of the oceans in the geologic past
- Paleoecology – Study of interactions between organisms and their environments across geologic timescales
- Paleothermometer – Methodology for the study of ancient temperatures
- Paleohydrology – Study of hydrology over geological time
- Paleotempestology – Study of past tropical cyclone activity
- Paleomap – Map of continents and mountain ranges in the past based on plate reconstructions
- Reducing atmosphere – Atmosphere containing reducing agents
- Table of historic and prehistoric climate indicators
