= Energy budget =

Balance of energy income against expenditure

An energy budget is a balance sheet of energy income against expenditure. It is studied in the field of energetics, which deals with the study of energy transfer and transformation from one form to another. Calories and joules are the basic units of measurement. An organism in a laboratory experiment is an open thermodynamic system, exchanging energy with its surroundings in three – heat, work and the potential energy of biochemical compounds.

Organisms use ingested food resources (C=consumption) as building blocks in the synthesis of tissues (P=production) and as fuel in the metabolic process that power this synthesis and other physiological processes (R=respiratory loss). Some of the resources are lost as waste products (F=faecal loss, U=urinary loss). All these aspects of metabolism can be represented in energy units. The basic model of energy budget may be shown as:

P = C - R - U - F or

P = C - (R + U + F) or

C = P + R + U + F

All the aspects of metabolism can be represented in energy units (e.g. joules (J);1 calorie = 4.2 kJ). Energy used for metabolism will be

R = C - (F + U + P)

Energy used in the maintenance will be

R + F + U = C - P

== Endothermy and ectothermy ==
Energy budget allocation varies for endotherms and ectotherms. Ectotherms rely on the environment as a heat source while endotherms maintain their body temperature through the regulation of metabolic processes. The heat produced in association with metabolic processes facilitates the active lifestyles of endotherms and their ability to travel far distances over a range of temperatures in the search for food. Ectotherms are limited by the ambient temperature of the environment around them but the lack of substantial metabolic heat production accounts for an energetically inexpensive metabolic rate. The energy demands for ectotherms are generally one tenth of that required for endotherms.
