= Atmosphere =

Layer of gases surrounding an astronomical body held by gravity

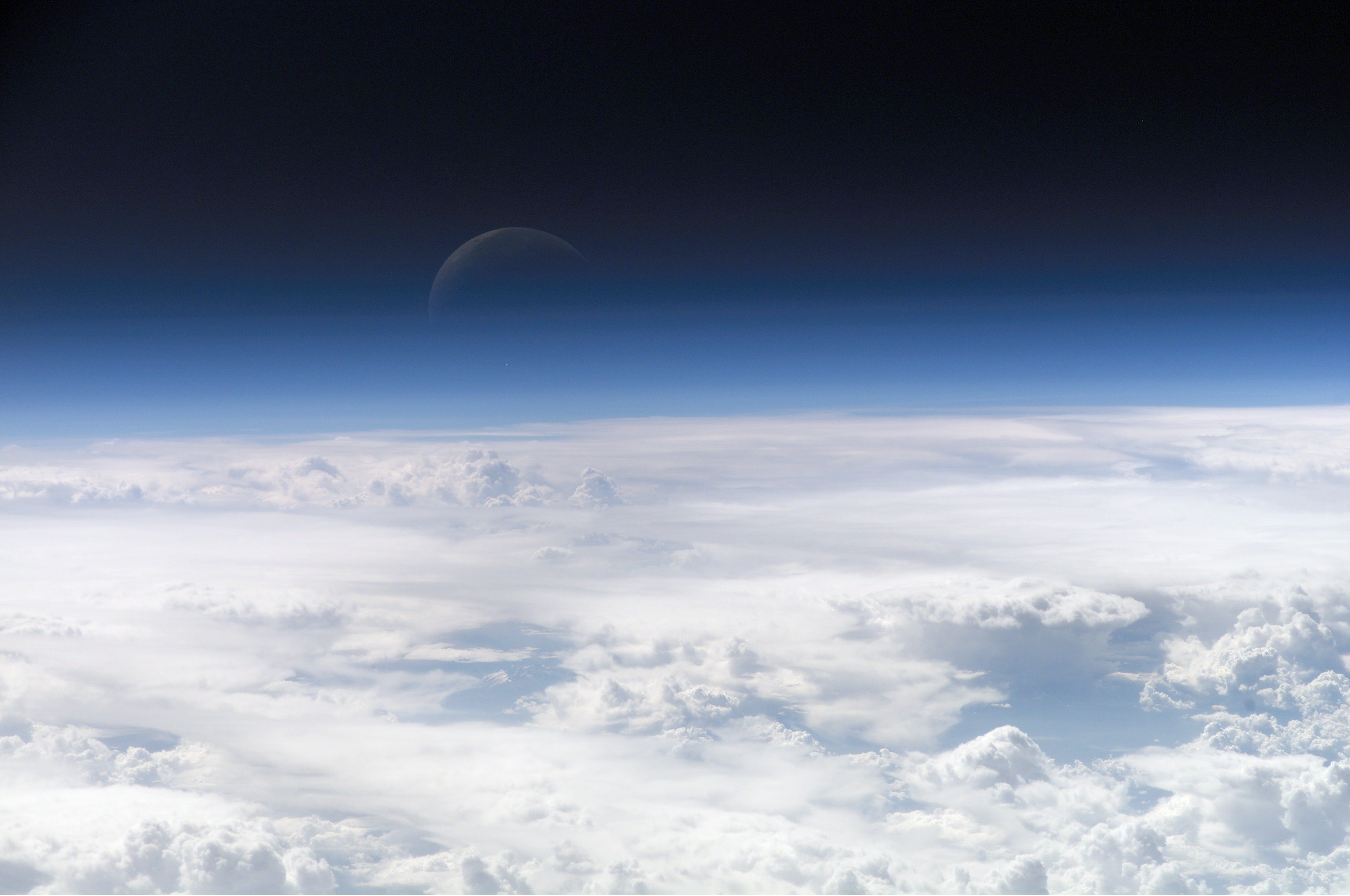
The atmospheric gases around Earth scatter blue light (shorter wavelengths) more than light toward the red end (longer wavelengths) of the visible spectrum; thus, a blue glow over the horizon is seen when observing Earth from outer space. The Moon is visible in the background.

An atmosphere is a layer of gases that envelop an astronomical object, held in place by the gravity of the object. The name originates from Ancient Greek ἀτμός (atmós) 'vapour, steam' and σφαῖρα (sphaîra) 'sphere'. An object acquires most of its atmosphere during its primordial epoch, either by accretion of matter or by outgassing of volatiles. The chemical interaction of the atmosphere with a solid surface can change its fundamental composition, as can photochemical interaction with the host star. A body retains an atmosphere for longer durations when the gravity is high and the temperature is low. The stellar wind works to strip away a body's outer atmosphere, although this process is slowed by a magnetosphere. The further a body is from its star, the lower the rate of atmospheric stripping.

Aside from Mercury, all Solar System planets have substantial atmospheres, as does the dwarf planet Pluto and the moon Titan. The high gravity and low temperature of Jupiter and the other gas giant planets allow them to retain massive atmospheres of mostly hydrogen and helium. Lower mass terrestrial planets orbit closer to the Sun, so they retain mainly higher molar mass atmospheres made of carbon, nitrogen, and oxygen, with trace amounts of inert gas, as in the atmosphere of Earth. Atmospheres have been detected around exoplanets such as HD 209458 b and Kepler-7b.

A stellar atmosphere is the outer region of a star, which includes the layers above the opaque photosphere; stars of low temperature might have outer atmospheres containing compound molecules. Other objects with atmospheres are brown dwarfs, white dwarfs, and active comets.

== Occurrence and compositions ==
=== Origins ===
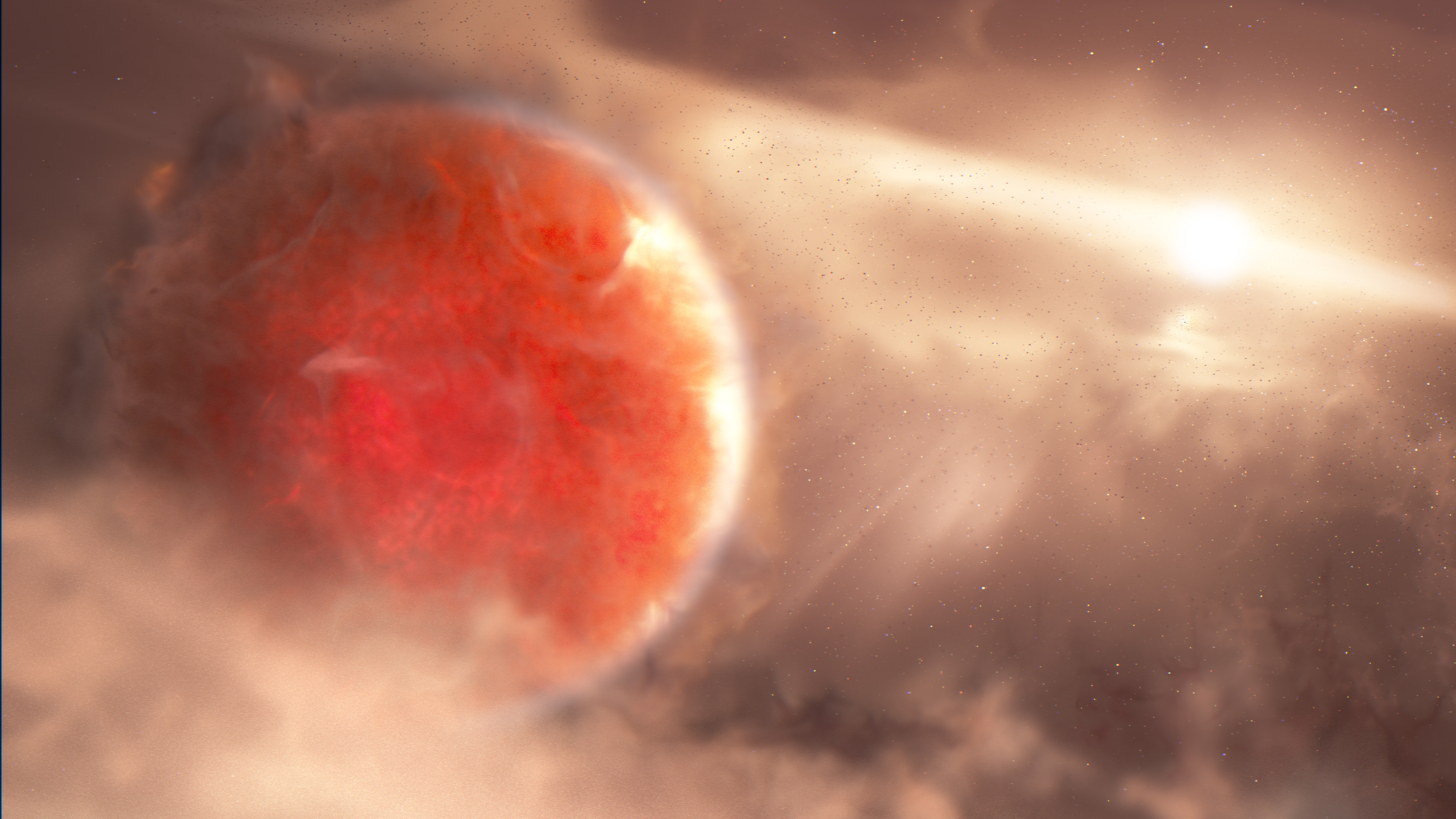
Artist's impression of a newly-formed protoplanet

In the nebular hypothesis, stars form during the gravitational collapse of a mass of gas and dust within an interstellar molecular cloud. This material forms a pancake-like rotating disk with the mass concentrated at the center. The protostar is created at the central mass concentration, while the planets and satellites are formed in the disk through a process of accretion. Dust settles into the median disk plane, forming materials that can collide and accrete to create planetesimals. Close to the star, these bodies grow and accumulate to form protoplanets consisting primarily of refractory materials with few volatiles. Further from the star, planetary embryos are created from accumulation of volatiles up to around ten times the mass of the Earth or more. Masses of gas are then acquired from the surrounding disk nebula, forming a gas giant around the embryo. Planetary satellites form in a similar fashion from the disk of material around the planets.

The primary atmosphere of a planet is produced when the gravity is sufficient to retain accreted gas against escape processes. The latter can include collisions with other bodies that impart sufficient energy for the gasses to escape. For the terrestrial planets, the high temperatures generated by their initial bombardment results in the outgassing of volatiles, creating the secondary atmosphere. The original composition and thickness of the atmosphere is thus determined by the stellar nebula's chemistry and temperature, but can be modified by processes within the astronomical body that release different atmospheric components.

The circumstellar disk will finally dissipate on time scales of about 10^{7} years, and the star will complete its contraction then ignite hydrogen fusion at its core in a time frame determined by its mass. (For example, a star with the mass of the Sun will spend 3×10^{7} years contracting.)

=== Compositions ===
Graphs of escape velocity against surface temperature of some Solar System objects showing which gases are retained. The objects are drawn to scale, and their data points are at the black dots in the middle.

The atmospheres of the planets Venus and Mars are principally composed of carbon dioxide, nitrogen, and argon. Because Venus has no oceans or rain to dissolve the carbon dioxide, large amounts of this greenhouse gas has remained in the atmosphere. The result is a dense atmosphere about 80 times the pressure of Earth's atmosphere. The planet's lack of a magnetic field and closer proximity to the Sun resulted in the loss of its hydrogen (in the form of water) after two billion years.

Because Mars is small, cold, and lacks a magnetic field, it has retained only a sparse atmosphere. The surface air pressure of 0.6 kPa for Mars is only 0.6% of Earth's 101.3 kPa. The planet has probably lost at least 80–85% of its original water supply to space. However, the planet has retained significant deposits of frozen water and carbon dioxide. If all of the frozen CO_{2} were to sublimate, the air pressure could climb to 30 kPa. This is comparable to the air pressure on the top of Mount Everest.

The composition of Earth's atmosphere is determined by the by-products of the life that it sustains. Dry air (mixture of gases) from Earth's atmosphere contains 78.08% nitrogen, 20.95% oxygen, 0.93% argon, 0.04% carbon dioxide, and traces of hydrogen, helium, and other "noble" gases (by volume), but generally a variable amount of water vapor is also present, on average about 1% at sea level. Earth's persistent magnetosphere acts as a shield against atmospheric scavenging by the solar wind, as it fends off the incoming plasma at a distance of about 10 Earth radii.

The low temperatures and higher escape velocities of the Solar System's giant planets—Jupiter, Saturn, Uranus and Neptune—allow them more readily to retain gases with low molecular masses. These planets have reducing atmospheres of hydrogen and helium, with trace amounts of other elements and more complex compounds. Unlike the terrestrial planets, the gas giants lack a well-defined surface. Instead the atmosphere is maintained in hydrostatic equilibrium by intense pressure deep in the body. The dynamic weather on these bodies only occurs in a relatively thin surface layer.

Two satellites of the outer planets possess significant atmospheres. Titan, a moon of Saturn, and Triton, a moon of Neptune, have atmospheres mainly of nitrogen. When in the part of its orbit closest to the Sun, Pluto has an atmosphere of nitrogen and methane similar to Triton's, but the bulk of these gases are frozen when it is farther from the Sun.

Other bodies within the Solar System have extremely thin atmospheres not in equilibrium. These include the Moon (sodium gas, noble gases, hydrogen), Mercury (sodium gas), Callisto (carbon dioxide and oxygen), Europa (oxygen), Io (sulfur dioxide), and Enceladus (water vapor).

==== Exoplanets ====
Planetary objects around distant stars, known as exoplanets, span a more diverse range of physical properties than is found in the Solar System. These targets provide an opportunity to study atmospheres around a broad span of objects and conditions. However, observations of these targets requires much more sensitive instrumentation. The methods used to analyze these remote atmospheres are transit spectroscopy, high-resolution Doppler spectroscopy, and direct imaging.

Transit spectroscopy uses the transit of an exoplanet across its host star to detect its atmosphere. By comparing the radius at different wavelengths, the presence of specific components can be detected. The first such detection was in 2002, when sodium was detected in the atmosphere of HD 209458b, a gas giant with a close orbit around a star in the constellation Pegasus. Its atmosphere is heated to temperatures over 1,000 K, and is steadily escaping into space. Hydrogen, oxygen, and carbon have been detected in the planet's inflated atmosphere by Hubble observations. Since 2002, potassium has been detected in the atmosphere of XO-2Nb, and both sodium and potassium in HD 189733 b's atmosphere.

Many of the discovered super earths have orbits close enough to their host star that their surfaces are expected to be magma oceans. The secondary atmospheres of these lava planets most likely consist of materials that have been vaporized from the magma, such as sodium, potassium, oxygen, and silicon oxide.

=== Atmospheres in the Solar System ===
Atmosphere	Surface Pressure (kPa)	Mean surface temperature (K)	Surface gravity (ɡ_{0})	Scale height (km)	Primary composition (by volume)		Notes
Sun	0.1259	5,772 (eff.)	27.94	–	91.0% H	8.9% He	
Mercury	Negligible	440	0.38	–	Na, Mg, O, H, K, Ca		
Venus	9,200	737	0.90	15.9	96.5% CO_{2}	3.5% N_{2}	
Earth	101	288	1.00	8.5	78.1% N_{2}	21.0% O_{2}	
Moon	Negligible	253	0.17	–	He, Ne, H_{2}, Ar		
Mars	1	214	0.38	11.0	95.1% CO_{2}	2.6% N_{2}	
Ceres	Negligible	168	0.03	–	H_{2}O		
Jupiter	(At 100)	165	2.64	27	89.8% H_{2}	10.2% He	
Io	Negligible	118	0.18	–	SO_{2}		
Callisto	Negligible	103	0.13	–	O_{2} and some CO_{2}		
Europa	Negligible	103	0.13	–	O_{2}		
Ganymede	Negligible	113	0.15	–	O_{2}		
Saturn	(At 100)	134	1.14	59.5	96.3% H_{2}	3.25% He	
Titan	147	93	0.14	20	98.4% N_{2}	1.5% CH_{4}	
Enceladus	Negligible	72	0.01	–	H_{2}O and CO_{2}		
Uranus	(At 100)	76	0.92	27.7	82.5% H_{2}	15.2% He	
Titania	Tenuous	70	0.04	30 to 95	Possibly CO_{2}, CH_{4}, or N_{2}		
Neptune	(At 100)	72	1.15	19.1 to 20.3	80.0% H_{2}	19.0% He	
Triton	0.001	38	0.08	14.8	Mostly N_{2}		
Pluto	0.001	24 to 38	0.063	18	99% N_{2}	0.5% CH_{4}	
2002 XV_{93}	0.00002	40 to 50	–	–	unknown; either N_{2}, Ar, or CH_{4}?		

== Conditions ==
An atmosphere in hydrostatic equilibrium consists of a balance between the air pressure created by the motions of the molecules, and the restraining force of gravity that prevents the molecules from escaping. The pressure decreases in altitude, producing a pressure-gradient force. Atmospheric pressure is the force (per unit-area) perpendicular to a unit-area of planetary surface, as determined by the weight of the vertical column of atmospheric gases. In said atmospheric model, the atmospheric pressure, the weight of the mass of the gas, decreases at high altitude because of the diminishing mass of the gas above the point of barometric measurement. Air pressure varies by place and time due to meteorological conditions and atmospheric waves.

Units of air pressure are based upon the standard atmosphere (atm), which is 101,325 Pa (equivalent to 760 Torr or 14.696 psi). For an ideal gas atmosphere, the height at which the atmospheric pressure declines by a factor of e (the base of the natural logarithm) is called the scale height (H). For an atmosphere of uniform temperature, the scale height is proportional to the atmospheric temperature and is inversely proportional to the product of the mean molecular mass of dry air, and the local acceleration of gravity at the point of barometric measurement.

The temperature of the atmosphere is determined by an energy budget, which balances the heating from the incoming solar energy and internal heat sources against the heat radiated back into space. The incoming energy is determined by the distance from the Sun, and the energy reflected back out by the planetary albedo. When a planet is in radiative equilibrium, it has a planetary equilibrium temperature. This differs from the global mean temperature, which may be warmer than the equilibrium temperature due to the atmospheric greenhouse effect. For example, Venus has a surface temperature of almost 460 C compared to an equilibrium temperature of −40 C.

== Structure ==
Planetary atmospheres are composed of layers with different properties, such as specific gaseous composition, temperature gradients, and pressure.

=== Terrestrial planets ===
For Earth, Mars, and Venus, the lowest level of the atmosphere is the troposphere, where most of the planet's clouds and weather are found. This extends from the ground up to 65 km on Venus, 40 km on Mars, and 17 km on Earth. The troposphere contains the bulk of the atmosphere, possessing 80%–98% of the total atmospheric mass. Temperature varies by altitude according to the lapse rate, as thermal energy from the ground is transported upward via convection. Infrared radiation becomes trapped by molecules of gas and water vapor. For the Earth, the next layer is the stratosphere, which is a region of temperature increasing with altitude, creating a temperature inversion. This region contains the UV-absorbing ozone layer, at an altitude between 15 km and 35 km, which is responsible for the temperature rise. Energy transport in this region occurs through radiation processes. Lacking an oxygenated atmosphere to generate a significant layer of ozone, neither Mars nor Venus have a stratosphere.

Above the troposphere-stratosphere, the next layer of the atmosphere is termed the mesosphere. In this region, the water vapor and carbon dioxide serves as a heat sink that radiates energy in the infrared. As a result, the temperature of the mesosphere decreases with altitude, reaching the coldest layer of the atmosphere at the top. Both Venus and Mars have an altitude range in the mesosphere where the temperature is nearly isothermal; for Mars this is above 120 km, while for Venus it is between 63 and 75 km altitude.

In the lower regions of the atmosphere, turbulent mixing causes the atmospheric constituents to be evenly distributed. Above a transition layer called the homopause, molecular diffusion dominates. This results in diffuse separation of the constituents by atomic weight; that is, lower mass components diffuse upward leaving higher mass molecules near the bottom. The homopause is at an altitude of 100–110 km for the Earth, 115–130 km for Mars, and 135–150 km for Venus.

Beyond the mesosphere is a region of the atmosphere called the thermosphere that absorbs X-rays and extreme UV from the Sun, causing temperature to rise with altitude. The thermal properties of this layer vary daily and with solar activity cycles. The atmospheric region from the ground through the thermosphere is referred to as the barosphere, since the barometric law holds throughout.

The outermost layer of a planetary atmosphere is termed the exosphere. Here, the air pressure is so low at this altitude that the distance travelled between molecule collisions, the mean free path, is greater than the atmospheric scale height. In this region, lower mass components with a thermal velocity exceeding the escape velocity can escape into space. Molecular diffusion becomes an important factor in determining the atmospheric composition. For the Earth, the exosphere is at an altitude of 500 km, while it is around 210 km for Venus and Mars. On Earth, the exosphere extends to roughly 10,000 km, where it interacts with the magnetosphere of Earth.

All three planets have an ionosphere, which is an ionized region of the upper atmosphere. The ionospheres for Mars and Venus are closer to the surface and are less dense than on the Earth. The density of the Earth's ionosphere is greater at short distances from the planetary surface in the daytime and decreases as the ionosphere rises at night-time, thereby allowing a greater range of radio frequencies to travel greater distances.

=== Gas giants ===
Gas giants are primarily composed of hydrogen and helium with traces of other elements, giving the planets a low bulk density. Many of the molecules observed in the outer atmosphere are hydrides, and most of these (with the exception of H_{2}O and H_{2}S) are photochemically destroyed by solar UV in the stratosphere of Jupiter and Saturn. These compounds get re-created by thermo-chemical reactions within the hotter, lower regions of the atmosphere. Complex organic compounds are recycled back to methane by the highly reducing atmosphere. The high gravity of these planets combined with their distance from the Sun means that mass loss from their exospheres is negligible, so they form closed systems.

A common feature of the gas giant planets are cloud layers that form where the combination of temperature and pressure are appropriate for condensing a particular volatile. For Jupiter and Saturn, the outermost cloud layer consists of ice particles of ammonia (NH_{3}), with an underlying layer of ammonium hydrosulfide (NH_{4}SH), then a deep layer of water clouds (H_{2}O). For Uranus and Neptune, the top layer is a methane (CH_{4}) layer of ice particles, followed by the same cloud layers as Jupiter and Saturn. One difference for Uranus and Neptune is that hydrogen sulfide (H_{2}S) mixes at the same level as the condensed ammonia. These cloud layers are optically thick, absorbing light at all wavelengths. The result is a shallower scale height for the outer atmosphere. All four gas giants experience lightning activity in the water clouds, and this is generally much more powerful than terrestrial lightning. Lightning has been observed on Jupiter, but has not been optically detected on Saturn, Uranus, or Neptune most likely because of their depth.

All of the gas giants have internal heat sources and radiate more heat than they receive from the Sun. Models for the interiors of Jupiter and Saturn suggest that at a certain depth the hydrogen undergoes a phase change to a metallic hydrogen fluid mixed with ice. There is possibly a diffuse or solid core of more massive elements. For Uranus and Neptune, there is no metallic hydrogen; instead there are interior layers of ice, placing these worlds in the sub-category of ice giants. At sufficient depth, the ice may transition to a supercritical fluid.

Within the Solar System, gas giant planets formed beyond the frost line, where the temperature from the young Sun was low enough for volatiles to condense into solid grains. In some star systems, dynamic processes in the protoplanetary disk can cause a gas giant to migrate much closer to the central star, creating a hot Jupiter. A prototype example is 51 Pegasi b. Through gravitational interaction, the orbit of the planet becomes circularized and it is tidally locked into a synchronous rotation with one side constantly facing the star. The heated side becomes swollen, and high velocity winds distribute the thermal energy around the planet. The atmosphere may eventually be stripped away by the star's gravity, leaving behind a super Earth.

At the upper mass extreme of gas giants is a class of objects known as brown dwarfs. There is no universal consensus on how to distinguish a brown dwarf from a gas giant, although a commonly used criteria is the ability to fuse deuterium at around 13 times the mass of Jupiter. Once the initial deuterium burning phase of a brown dwarf is concluded, the internal store of heat gradually makes its way to the surface then is radiated away over time. Convection occurs around the core, and possibly at the surface if the brown dwarf is receiving energy from a nearby star. Radiative energy transfer occurs throughout the remainder of the brown dwarf. Chemistry can occur throughout the atmosphere, which, depending on the chemical species, can change the opacity to radiative energy transfer. As with gas giants, in the cooler outer regions of a brown dwarf, some molecules can condense to form clouds.

== Circulation ==
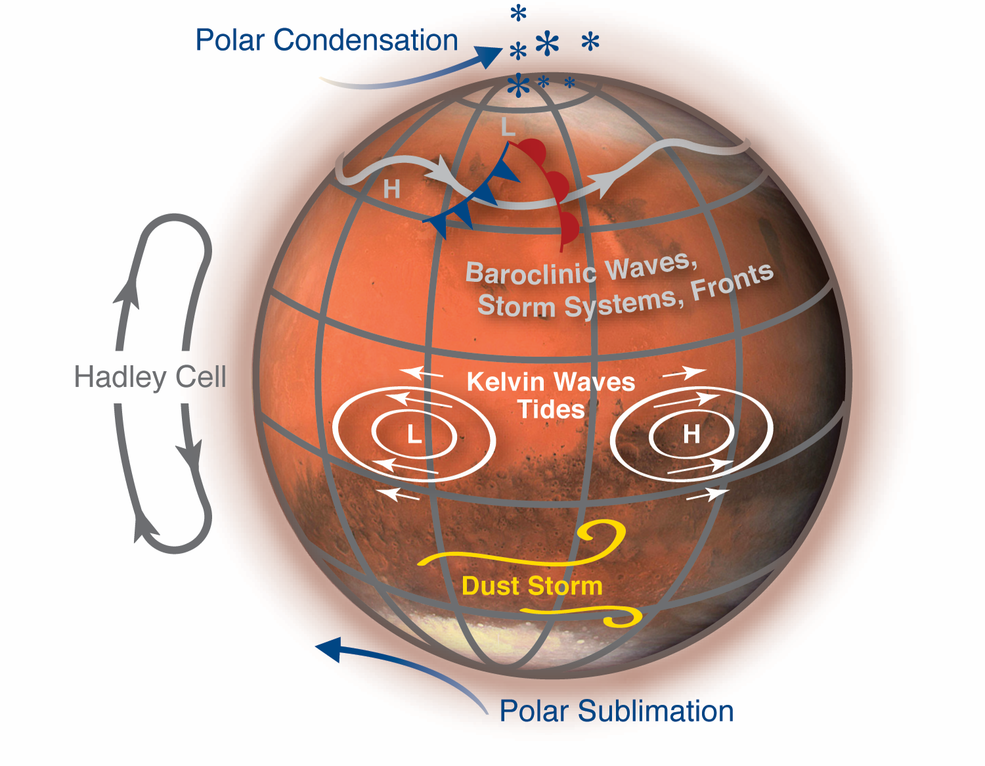
Global atmospheric circulation on Mars during solstice

The circulation of the atmosphere occurs due to thermal differences when convection becomes a more efficient transporter of heat than thermal radiation. On planets where the primary heat source is solar radiation, excess heat in the tropics is transported to higher latitudes. When a planet generates a significant amount of heat internally, such as is the case for Jupiter, convection in the atmosphere can transport thermal energy from the higher temperature interior up to the surface.

The thermally-driven meridional circulation of Earth, Mars, and Venus are dominated by the Hadley cell. This is created by rising air in the warmest region of the planet accompanied by descending air where it is cooler. However, there are significant differences in the circulation patterns between the three planets. For Venus, the lower atmosphere of Venus has two symmetrical equator to near pole circulation cells, with a higher altitude sub-solar to anti-solar circulation cell. On Earth, Hadley cells exist on each side of the equator, but these vary seasonally due to the planet's obliquity. Mars is similar to the Earth in this respect, but it displays greater seasonality due to its thinner atmosphere. It has two Hadley cells during equinox, but a single cell at solstice.

The Earth has multiple counter-rotating convection cells, with the Hadley cell on either side of the equator, an intermediate Ferrel cell along the mid-latitudes, and polar cells at each pole. The planet's rotation induces a Coriolis force that creates a curvature in the north-south convection flow. As air moves toward a pole, the latitudinal flow remains steady but the distance needed to encircle the planet grows shorter, creating a curved path along the surface. These flows create the prevailing winds along the planet's surface. Near the equator, the air flow creates the trade winds which flow from east to west. At the mid-latitudes, the westerlies brings the air flow from the west in the United States and Europe. Finally, the polar easterlies moves polar air from east to west.

Both Jupiter and Saturn display banded cloud formations. These are associated with alternating jets known as zonal flows that follow latitudinal lines. The bands alternate in direction, with the equatorial jet moving eastward at over 100 m/s on Jupiter and more than 400 m/s on Saturn. It remains unclear whether these flows occur in the shallow layers around the clouds, or extend much deeper into the atmosphere. Observations of Neptune show a similar zonal flow structure. This planet displays the largest range of differential rotation in the Solar System.

== Escape ==
Surface gravity differs significantly among the planets. For example, the large gravitational force of the giant planet Jupiter retains light gases such as hydrogen and helium that escape from objects with lower gravity. Secondly, the distance from the Sun determines the energy available to heat atmospheric gas to the point where some fraction of its molecules' thermal motion exceed the planet's escape velocity, allowing those to escape a planet's gravitational grasp. Thus, distant and cold Titan, Triton, and Pluto are able to retain components of their original atmospheres despite their relatively low gravities.

Since a collection of gas molecules may be moving at a wide range of velocities, there will always be some fast enough to produce a slow leakage of gas into space. Lighter molecules move faster than heavier ones with the same thermal kinetic energy, and so gases of low molecular weight are lost more rapidly than those of high molecular weight. It is thought that Venus and Mars may have lost much of their water when, after being photodissociated into hydrogen and oxygen by solar ultraviolet radiation, the hydrogen escaped. Earth's magnetic field helps to prevent this, as, normally, the solar wind would greatly enhance the escape of hydrogen. However, over the past 3 billion years Earth may have lost gases through the magnetic polar regions due to auroral activity, including a net 2% of its atmospheric oxygen. The net effect, taking the most important escape processes into account, is that an intrinsic magnetic field does not protect a planet from atmospheric escape and that for some magnetizations the presence of a magnetic field works to increase the escape rate.

Planets around small M-type main-sequence stars may be particularly prone to atmospheric loss. The star will spend an extended period as a superluminous pre-main-sequence star, then experience high levels of activity. The strong stellar magnetic field will tend to reduce the size of planetary magnetospheres, leading to greater erosion from the stellar wind. Planets around older M-type stars may become tidally locked in synchronous orbit, leading to the atmosphere being permanently frozen on the dark face.

Other mechanisms that can cause atmosphere depletion are solar wind-induced sputtering, impact erosion, weathering, and sequestration—sometimes referred to as "freezing out"—into the regolith and polar caps. An extreme example of the latter is a comet, which is a small body that forms beyond the frost line in the protoplanetary disk. These objects contain many types of frozen volatiles, including water, carbon dioxide, ammonia, methane, and formaldehyde. As these objects approach the Sun, the thermal radiation causes the volatiles to sublimate, creating a diffuse, dusty atmosphere around the comet; the coma. However, the gravitational potential of the comet is insufficient to retain this atmosphere.

The Solar System contains a large number of bodies that are now practically airless, such as Mercury and the Moon. These objects have only an exosphere layer with particles that are essentially collisionless. In this environment, atoms and molecules are released from the surface by various means, including particle sputtering and micrometeorite impact. When the release velocity of these particles exceed the escape velocity, they are lost to space. Higher mass particles have a greater chance to be returned to the surface, which creates a chemical alteration of the surface over time.

== Terrain ==
On a terrestrial planet, the part of the atmosphere that directly interacts with the ground is known as the planetary boundary layer. Atmospheres have dramatic effects on the surfaces of rocky bodies. Wind erosion is a significant factor in shaping the terrain of rocky planets with atmospheres, and over time can erase the effects of both craters and volcanoes. In addition, since liquids cannot exist without pressure, an atmosphere allows liquid to be present at the surface, resulting in lakes, rivers and oceans. Earth and Titan are known to have liquids at their surface and terrain on the planet Mars suggests that it had liquid on its surface in the past.

Objects that have no atmosphere, or that have only an exosphere, have terrain that is covered in craters. Without an atmosphere, the planet has no protection from meteoroids, and all of them collide with the surface as meteorites and create craters. For planets with a significant atmosphere, most meteoroids burn up as meteors before hitting a planet's surface. When meteoroids do impact, the effects are often erased by the action of wind.

== Fields of study ==
From the perspective of a planetary geologist, the atmosphere acts to shape a planetary surface. Wind picks up dust and other particles which, when they collide with the terrain, erode the relief and leave deposits (eolian processes). Frost and precipitations, which depend on the atmospheric composition, also influence the relief. Climate changes can influence a planet's geological history. Conversely, studying the surface of the Earth leads to an understanding of the atmosphere and climate of other planets.

For a meteorologist, the composition of the Earth's atmosphere is a factor affecting the climate and its variations.

For a biologist or paleontologist, the Earth's atmospheric composition is closely dependent on the appearance of life and its evolution. In astrobiology, the composition of an exoplanet's atmosphere is closely intertwined with the possibility of extraterrestrial life.

== See also ==
- Atmometer (evaporimeter)
- Atmospheric pressure
- Cosmic shoreline
- Extraterrestrial atmosphere
- International Standard Atmosphere
- Kármán line
- Sky
