= Primary atmosphere =

Atmosphere of a protoplanet

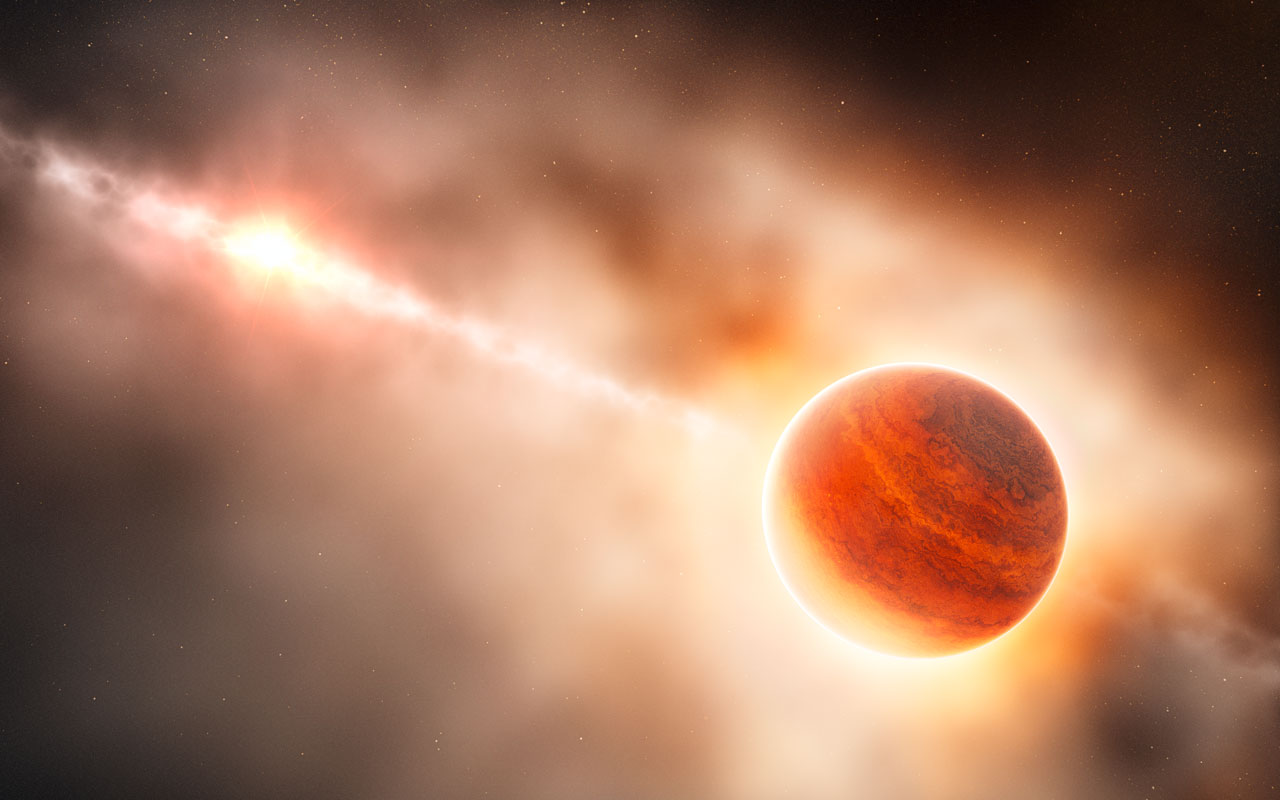
Gas giant formation in the protoplanetary disk around young star HD 100546 (Artist's impression).

A primary atmosphere, often also called a primordial atmosphere or proto-atmosphere, is an atmosphere of a protoplanet that forms by accretion of gaseous matter from the protoplanetary disk. Gas giant planets such as Jupiter and Saturn have primary atmospheres. Primary atmospheres are very thick compared to secondary atmospheres like the one found on Earth. The primary atmosphere was lost on the terrestrial planets of the Solar System due to a combination of surface temperature, mass of the atoms and the escape velocity of the planet.

== Formation and Composition ==
=== Protoplanetary disk formation ===
Primary atmospheres begin to form during the early stages of a solar system's development. As a star forms from a collapsing cloud of gas and dust, the remaining material flattens into a rotating disk around the star, known as the protoplanetary disk. This disk is rich in gases like hydrogen and helium, which are the most abundant elements in the universe.

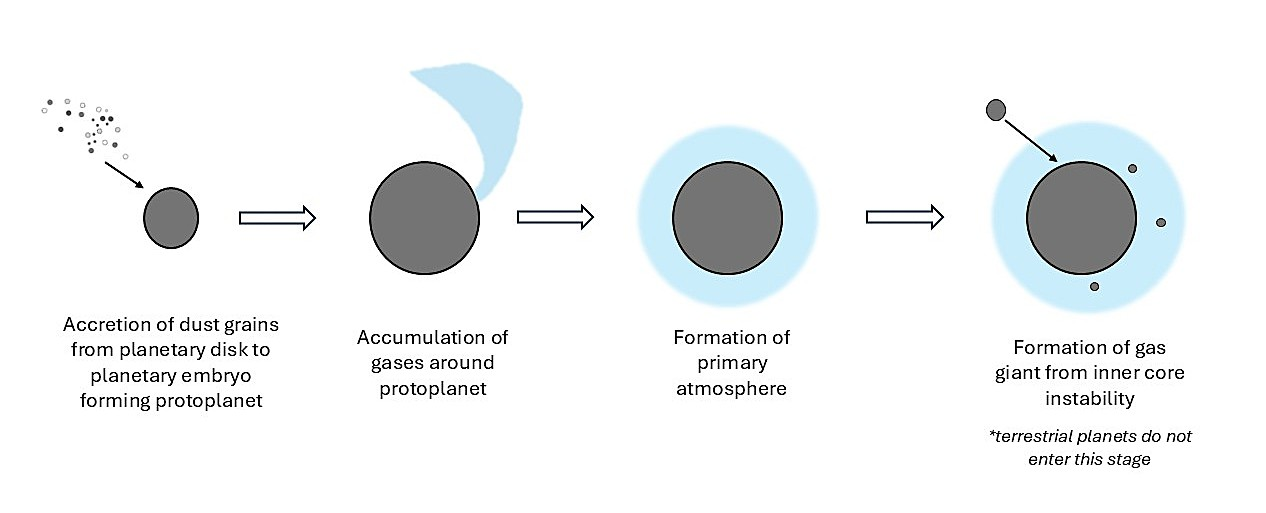
Core accretion process to create a primary atmosphere around a protoplanet.

=== Accretion of gases ===
Planets start to form within this disk through the process of accretion. As dust and solid materials coalesce to form planetesimals and eventually protoplanets, these bodies begin to exert gravitational forces. The gravity of these growing protoplanets attracts surrounding gases from the protoplanetary disk. Larger planets, particularly those forming in the colder outer regions of the disk, are capable of attracting more substantial envelopes of gas, leading to the formation of thick primary atmospheres.

Gas accretion processes can be influenced by mass and temperature of the protoplanet as well as chemical and physical conditions of the planetary disk. Accretion can be dependent on the host star's solar radiation and wind environment and the temperature and density of the surrounding gases in the planetary disk. A protoplanet will continue to accrete gases to its surface while resources are available. Its primary atmosphere can be lost however, due to the onset of atmospheric escape or outgassing of gases with low boiling points called volatiles. Atmospheric escape will occur after intense exposure to X-ray and UV radiation and stellar wind, driving gases to reach a terminal escape velocity. The secondary atmosphere can also be initiated from outgassed volatiles from the planetary core and mantle like water vapor and carbon dioxide or from volatiles contributed during collisions. The development of a proto-atmosphere is dependent on where it is formed within the protoplanetary disk or after it dissipates, resulting in the formation of a secondary atmosphere.

== Gas Accretion and Planetary Characteristics ==
=== Accretion ===
The composition of a primary atmosphere is primarily hydrogen and helium, with minor amounts of other volatiles like water vapor, methane, and ammonia, depending on the temperature and region of the protoplanetary disk. These atmospheres are generally thick and extended, enveloping the young planet in a dense layer of gas.

=== Characteristics ===
A protoplanet's ability to keep its dense hydrogen/helium rich envelope is dependent on mass, rate of accretion, temperature, and its position within the planetary disk. The structure and mass for a hydrogen-rich atmosphere will also depend on ambient disk conditions, energy supply rates, and opacity of dust grains. Primary atmospheres are characteristic for the giant planets of the Solar System as compared to the terrestrial planets that are hydrogen-poor and thin. Gas giants Jupiter and Saturn have maintained a thick primary atmosphere due to their unstable inner core. Their core is unstable because these giants accrete gaseous bodies faster than solid bodies. This results in hydrogen and helium compositing 85% and 60% of their atmospheres respectively. Ice giants Uranus and Neptune, which have heavier cores, are each 10% rich in hydrogen and helium.

== Planetary Evolution and Exoplanetary Insights ==
Using current detection and characterization techniques to understand planetary atmospheres of the Solar System are useful to understand exoplanet atmospheres are potential habitability. Atmospheric accretion and loss processes can vary based on the planetary body and can shape their evolution. For example, large planets with masses heavier than Earth like Jupiter and Saturn sufficiently capture hydrogen and helium. However, planets lighter than Earth can lose their primary atmosphere by burning excess gas or by hydrodynamic escape if they are orbiting a rapidly spinning star. Planetary cores with masses larger than Earth can accrete large amounts of gas thus reducing hydrodynamic escape and keeping its primordial atmosphere intact. Using Kepler and other satellites, planets of sub-Neptune and Neptune-size have been found that have hydrogen/helium envelopes.

== See also ==
1. Atmosphere of Earth
2. Atmosphere of Jupiter
3. Exoplanet Atmospheres
