= Reducing atmosphere =

Atmosphere containing reducing agents

A reducing atmosphere is an atmosphere in which oxidation is prevented by the absence of oxygen and other oxidizing gases or vapours, and which may contain actively reductant gases such as hydrogen, carbon monoxide, methane and hydrogen sulfide that would be readily oxidized to remove any free oxygen. Although Early Earth had a reducing prebiotic atmosphere prior to the Proterozoic eon, starting at about 2.5 billion years ago in the late Neoarchaean period, the Earth's atmosphere experienced a significant rise in oxygen and transitioned to an oxidizing atmosphere with a surplus of molecular oxygen (dioxygen, O_{2}) as the primary oxidizing agent.

== Foundry operations ==
The principal mission of an iron foundry is the conversion of iron oxides (purified iron ores) to iron metal. This reduction is usually effected using a reducing atmosphere consisting of some mixture of natural gas, hydrogen (H_{2}), and carbon monoxide. The byproduct is carbon dioxide.

== Metal processing ==
In metal processing, a reducing atmosphere is used in annealing ovens for relaxation of metal stresses without corroding the metal. A non-oxidizing gas, usually nitrogen or argon, is typically used as a carrier gas so that diluted amounts of reducing gases may be used. Typically, this is achieved through using the combustion products of fuels and tailoring the ratio of CO:CO_{2}. However, other common reducing atmospheres in the metal processing industries consist of dissociated ammonia, vacuum, and direct mixing of appropriately pure gases of N_{2}, Ar, and H_{2}.

A reducing atmosphere is also used to produce specific effects on ceramic wares being fired. A reduction atmosphere is produced in a fuel fired kiln by reducing the draft and depriving the kiln of oxygen. This diminished level of oxygen causes incomplete combustion of the fuel and raises the level of carbon inside the kiln. At high temperatures the carbon will bond with and remove the oxygen in the metal oxides used as colorants in the glazes. This loss of oxygen results in a change in the color of the glazes because it allows the metals in the glaze to be seen in an unoxidized form. A reduction atmosphere can also affect the color of the clay body. If iron is present in the clay body, as it is in most stoneware, then it will be affected by the reduction atmosphere as well.

In most commercial incinerators, exactly the same conditions are created to encourage the release of carbon-bearing fumes. These fumes are then oxidized in reburn tunnels where oxygen is injected progressively. The exothermic oxidation reaction maintains the temperature of the reburn tunnels. This system allows lower temperatures to be employed in the incinerator section, where the solids are volumetrically reduced.

== Origin of life ==
The atmosphere of Early Earth is widely speculated to have been reducing. The Miller–Urey experiment, related to some hypotheses for the origin of life, entailed reactions in a reducing atmosphere composed of a mixed atmosphere of methane, ammonia and hydrogen sulfide. Some hypotheses for the origin of life invoke a reducing atmosphere consisting of hydrogen cyanide (HCN). Experiments show that HCN can polymerize in the presence of ammonia to give various products including amino acids. The same principle applies to Mars, Venus and Titan.

Cyanobacteria are suspected to be the first photoautotrophs that evolved oxygenic photosynthesis, which over the latter half of the Archaen eon eventually depleted all reductants in the Earth's oceans, terrestrial surface and atmosphere, gradually increasing the oxygen concentration in the atmosphere, changing it to what is known as an oxidizing atmosphere. This rising oxygen initially led to a 300 million-year-long ice age that devastated the then-mostly anaerobe-dominated biosphere, forcing the surviving anaerobic colonies to evolve into symbiotic microbial mats with the newly evolved aerobes. Some aerobic bacteria eventually became endosymbionts within other anaerobes (likely archaea), and the resultant symbiogenesis led to the evolution of an entirely new lineage of life — the eukaryotes, who took advantage of mitochondrial aerobic respiration to power their cellular activities, allowing life to thrive and evolve into ever more complex forms. The increased oxygen in the atmosphere also eventually created the ozone layer, which shielded away harmful ionizing ultraviolet radiation that otherwise would have photodissociated away surface water and rendered life impossible on land and the ocean surface.

In contrast to the hypothesized early reducing atmosphere, evidence exists that Hadean atmospheric oxygen levels were similar to today's. These results suggest prebiotic building blocks were delivered from elsewhere in the galaxy. The results, however, do not contradict existing theories on life's journey from anaerobic to aerobic organisms. The results quantify the nature of gas molecules containing carbon, hydrogen, and sulfur in the earliest atmosphere, but they shed no light on the much later rise of free oxygen in the air.

== See also ==
- Atmosphere of Earth – Gas layer surrounding Earth
- Great Oxidation Event – Paleoproterozoic surge in atmospheric oxygen
- Paleoclimatology – Study of changes in ancient climate
- Paleoatmosphere – Ancient atmosphere, particularly of Earth, in the geological past
- Redox – Chemical reaction with oxidation state changes
