= Faint young Sun paradox =

Paradox concerning water on early Earth

Unsolved problem in astronomy
How can the early Earth have had liquid water if the Sun's output is theorized to have been only 70% as intense as it is today?
More unsolved problems in astronomy

The faint young Sun paradox or faint young Sun problem describes the apparent contradiction between observations of liquid water early in Earth's history and the astrophysical expectation that the Sun's output would have been only 70 percent as intense during that epoch as it is during the modern epoch. The paradox is this: with the young Sun's output at only 70 percent of its current output, early Earth would be expected to be completely frozen, but early Earth seems to have had liquid water and supported life.

The issue was raised by astronomers Carl Sagan and George Mullen in 1972. Proposed resolutions of this paradox have taken into account greenhouse effects, changes to planetary albedo, astrophysical influences, or combinations of these suggestions. The predominant theory is that the greenhouse gas carbon dioxide contributed most to the warming of the Earth.

== Solar evolution ==
Evolution of the Sun's luminosity, radius and effective temperature compared to the present Sun. After Ribas (2010).

Models of stellar structure, especially the standard solar model predict a brightening of the Sun. The brightening is caused by a decrease in the number of particles per unit mass due to nuclear fusion in the Sun's core, from four protons and electrons each to one helium nucleus and two electrons. Fewer particles would exert less pressure. A collapse under the enormous gravity is prevented by an increase in temperature, which is both cause and effect of a higher rate of nuclear fusion.

More recent modeling studies have shown that the Sun is currently 1.4 times as bright today as it was 4.6 billion years ago (Ga), and that the brightening has accelerated considerably. At the surface of the Sun, more fusion power means a higher solar luminosity (via slight increases in temperature and radius), which is termed radiative forcing.

== Hypotheses ==
=== Greenhouse gases ===
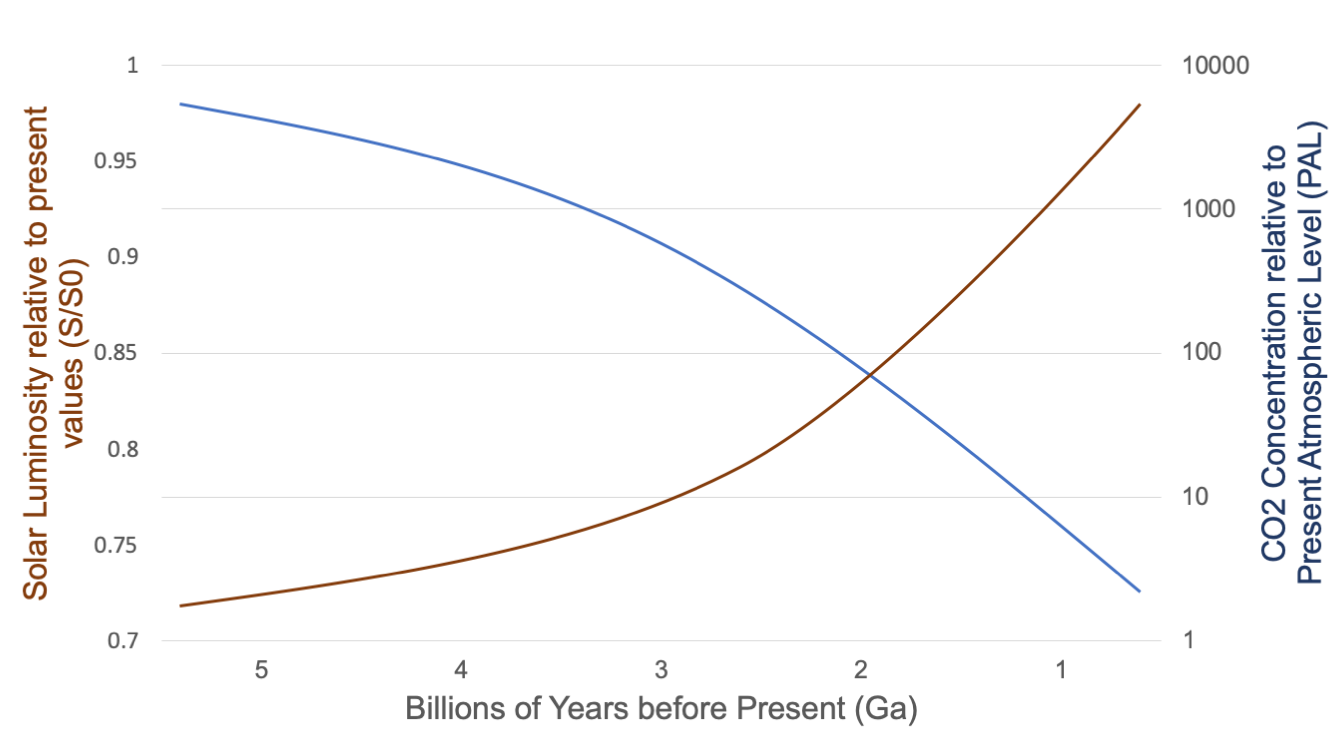
This conceptual graph shows the relationship between solar radiation and the greenhouse effect—in this case dominated by modulations in carbon dioxide.

Life timeline
← / Earth formed; ← / Earliest water; ← / LUCA; ← / Earliest fossils; ← / Great Oxygenation Event; ← / Sexual reproduction; ← / Earliest fungi; ← / Neoproterozoic oxygenation event; ← / Ediacaran biota; ← / Cambrian explosion; ← / Earliest tetrapods; ← / Earliest hominoid
(million years ago)

Sagan and Mullen suggested during their descriptions of the paradox that it might be solved by high concentrations of ammonia gas, NH_{3}. However, it has since been shown that while ammonia is an effective greenhouse gas, it is easily destroyed photochemically in the atmosphere and converted to nitrogen (N_{2}) and hydrogen (H_{2}) gases. It was suggested (again by Sagan) that a photochemical haze could have prevented this destruction of ammonia and allowed it to continue acting as a greenhouse gas during this time; however, by 2001, this idea was tested using a photochemical model and discounted. Furthermore, such a haze is thought to have cooled Earth's surface beneath it and counteracted the greenhouse effect. Around 2010, scholars at the University of Colorado revived the idea, arguing that the ammonia hypothesis is a viable contributor if the haze formed a fractal pattern.

It is now thought that carbon dioxide was present in higher concentrations during this period of lower solar radiation. It was first proposed and tested as part of Earth's atmospheric evolution in the late 1970s. An atmosphere that contained about 1,000 times the present atmospheric level (or PAL) was found to be consistent with the evolutionary path of Earth's carbon cycle and solar evolution.

The primary mechanism for attaining such high CO_{2} concentrations is the carbon cycle. On large timescales, the inorganic branch of the carbon cycle, which is known as the carbonate–silicate cycle is responsible for determining the partitioning of CO_{2} between the atmosphere and the surface of Earth. In particular, during a time of low surface temperatures, rainfall and weathering rates would be reduced, allowing for the build-up of carbon dioxide in the atmosphere on timescales of 0.5 million years.

Specifically, using 1-D models, which represent Earth as a single point (instead of something that varies across 3 dimensions) scientists have determined that at 4.5 Ga, with a 30% dimmer Sun, a minimum partial pressure of 0.1 bar of CO_{2} is required to maintain an above-freezing surface temperature; 10 bar of CO_{2} has been suggested as a plausible upper limit.

The amount of carbon dioxide is still under debate. In 2001, Sleep and Zahnle suggested that increased weathering on the sea floor on a young, tectonically active Earth could have reduced the abundance of carbon dioxide. Then in 2010, Rosing et al. analyzed marine sediments called banded iron formations and found large amounts of various iron-rich minerals, including magnetite (Fe_{3}O_{4}), an oxidized mineral alongside siderite (FeCO_{3}), a reduced mineral and saw that they formed during the first half of Earth's history (and not afterward). The minerals' relative coexistence suggested an analogous balance between CO_{2} and H_{2}. In the analysis, Rosing et al. connected the atmospheric H_{2} concentrations with regulation by biotic methanogenesis. Anaerobic, single-celled organisms that produced methane (CH_{4}) may therefore have contributed to the warming in addition to carbon dioxide.

=== Tidal heating ===
The Moon was originally much closer to the Earth, which rotated faster than it does today, resulting in greater tidal heating than experienced today. Original estimates found that even early tidal heating would be minimal, perhaps 0.02 watts per square meter. (For comparison, the solar energy incident on the Earth's atmosphere is on the order of 1,000 watts per square meter.)

However, around 2021, a team led by René Heller in Germany argued that such estimates were simplistic and that in some plausible models tidal heating might have contributed on the order of 10 watts per square meter and increased the equilibrium temperature by up to five degrees Celsius on a timescale of 100 million years. Such a contribution would partially resolve the paradox but is insufficient to solve the faint young paradox on its own without additional factors such as greenhouse heating. The underlying assumption of Moon's formation just outside of the Roche limit is not certain, however: a magnetized disk of debris could have transported angular momentum leading to a less massive Moon in a higher orbit.

=== Cosmic rays ===
A minority view propounded by the Israeli-American physicist Nir Shaviv uses climatological influences of solar wind combined with a hypothesis of Danish physicist Henrik Svensmark for a cooling effect of cosmic rays. According to Shaviv, the early Sun had emitted a stronger solar wind that produced a protective effect against cosmic rays. In that early age, a moderate greenhouse effect comparable to today's would have been sufficient to explain a largely ice-free Earth. Evidence for a more active early Sun has been found in meteorites.

The temperature minimum around 2.4 Ga goes along with a cosmic ray flux modulation by a variable star formation rate in the Milky Way. The reduced solar impact later results in a stronger impact of cosmic ray flux, which is hypothesized to lead to a relationship with climatological variations.

=== Mass loss from Sun ===
It has been proposed several times that mass loss from the faint young Sun in the form of a stronger solar wind could have compensated for the low temperatures from greenhouse gas forcing. In this framework, the early Sun underwent an extended period of higher solar wind output. Based on exoplanetary data, this caused a mass loss from the Sun of 5−6 percent over its lifetime, resulting in a more consistent level of solar luminosity (as the early Sun had more mass, resulting in more energy output than was predicted).

In order to explain the warm conditions in the Archean eon, this mass loss must have occurred over an interval of about one billion years. Records of ion implantation from meteorites and lunar samples show that the elevated rate of solar wind flux only lasted for a period of 100 million years. Observations of the young Sun-like star π^{1} Ursae Majoris match this rate of decline in the stellar wind output, suggesting that a higher mass loss rate cannot by itself resolve the paradox.

=== Changes in clouds ===
If greenhouse gas concentrations did not compensate completely for the fainter Sun, the moderate temperature range may be explained by a lower surface albedo. At the time, a smaller area of exposed continental land would have resulted in fewer cloud condensation nuclei both in the form of wind-blown dust and biogenic sources. A lower albedo allows a higher fraction of solar radiation to penetrate to the surface. Goldblatt and Zahnle (2011) investigated whether a change in cloud fraction could have been sufficiently warming and found that the net effect was equally as likely to have been negative as positive. At most the effect could have raised surface temperatures to just above freezing on average.

Another proposed mechanism of cloud cover reduction relates a decrease in cosmic rays during this time to reduced cloud fraction. However, this mechanism does not work for several reasons, including the fact that ions do not limit cloud formation as much as cloud condensation nuclei, and cosmic rays have been found to have little impact on global mean temperature. Clouds continue to be the dominant source of uncertainty in 3-D global climate models, and a consensus has yet to be reached on how changes in cloud spatial patterns and cloud type may have affected Earth's climate during this time.

=== Local Hubble expansion ===
Although both simulations and direct measurements of effects of Hubble's law on gravitationally bound systems are returning inconclusive results as of 2022, it was noted that orbital expansion with a fraction of local Hubble expansion rate may explain the observed anomalies in orbital evolution, including a faint young Sun paradox.

=== Gaia hypothesis ===
The Gaia hypothesis holds that biological processes work to maintain a stable surface climate on Earth to maintain habitability through various negative feedback mechanisms. While organic processes, such as the organic carbon cycle, work to regulate dramatic climate changes, and that the surface of Earth has presumably remained habitable, this hypothesis has been criticized as intractable. Furthermore, life has existed on the surface of Earth through dramatic changes in climate, including Snowball Earth episodes. There are also strong and weak versions of the Gaia hypothesis, which has caused some tension in this research area.

== On other planets ==
=== Mars ===
Mars has its own version of the faint young Sun paradox. Martian terrains show clear signs of past liquid water on the surface, including outflow channels, gullies, modified craters, and valley networks. These geomorphic features suggest Mars had an ocean on its surface and river networks that resemble current Earth's during the late Noachian (4.1–3.7 Ga). It is unclear how Mars's orbital pattern, which places it even further from the Sun, and the faintness of the young Sun could have produced what is thought to have been a very warm and wet climate on Mars. Scientists debate over which geomorphological features can be attributed to shorelines or other water flow markers and which can be ascribed to other mechanisms. Nevertheless, the geologic evidence, including observations of widespread fluvial erosion in the southern highlands, are generally consistent with an early warm and semi-arid climate.

Given the orbital and solar conditions of early Mars, a greenhouse effect would have been necessary to increase surface temperatures at least 65 K in order for these surface features to have been carved by flowing water. A much denser, CO_{2}-dominated atmosphere has been proposed as a way to produce such a temperature increase. This would depend upon the carbon cycle and the rate of volcanism throughout the pre-Noachian and Noachian, which is not well known. Volatile outgassing is thought to have occurred during these periods.

One way to ascertain whether Mars possessed a thick CO_{2}-rich atmosphere is to examine carbonate deposits. A primary sink for carbon in Earth's atmosphere is the carbonate–silicate cycle. However it would have been difficult for CO_{2} to have accumulated in the Martian atmosphere in this way because the greenhouse effect would have been outstripped by CO_{2} condensation.

A volcanically outgassed CO_{2}-H_{2} greenhouse is a plausible scenario suggested recently for early Mars. Intermittent bursts of methane may have been another possibility. Such greenhouse gas combinations appear necessary because carbon dioxide alone, even at pressures exceeding a few bar, cannot explain the temperatures required for the presence of surface liquid water on early Mars.

=== Venus ===
Venus's atmosphere is composed of 96% carbon dioxide. Billions of years ago, when the Sun was 25 to 30% dimmer, Venus's surface temperature could have been much cooler, and its climate could have resembled current Earth's, complete with a hydrological cycle—before it experienced a runaway greenhouse effect.

== See also ==
- Cool early Earth
- Effective temperature – of a planet, dependent on reflectivity of its surface and clouds.
- Isua Greenstone Belt
- List of cosmology paradoxes – List of statements that appear to contradict themselves
- Paleoclimatology
