= Lunar geologic timescale =

Geological dating system of the Moon

Chronology
Periods on the Lunar Geologic Timescale. Axis scale: Millions of years ago.

Usage information
- Celestial body: Earth's Moon
- Time scale(s) used: Lunar Geologic Timescale

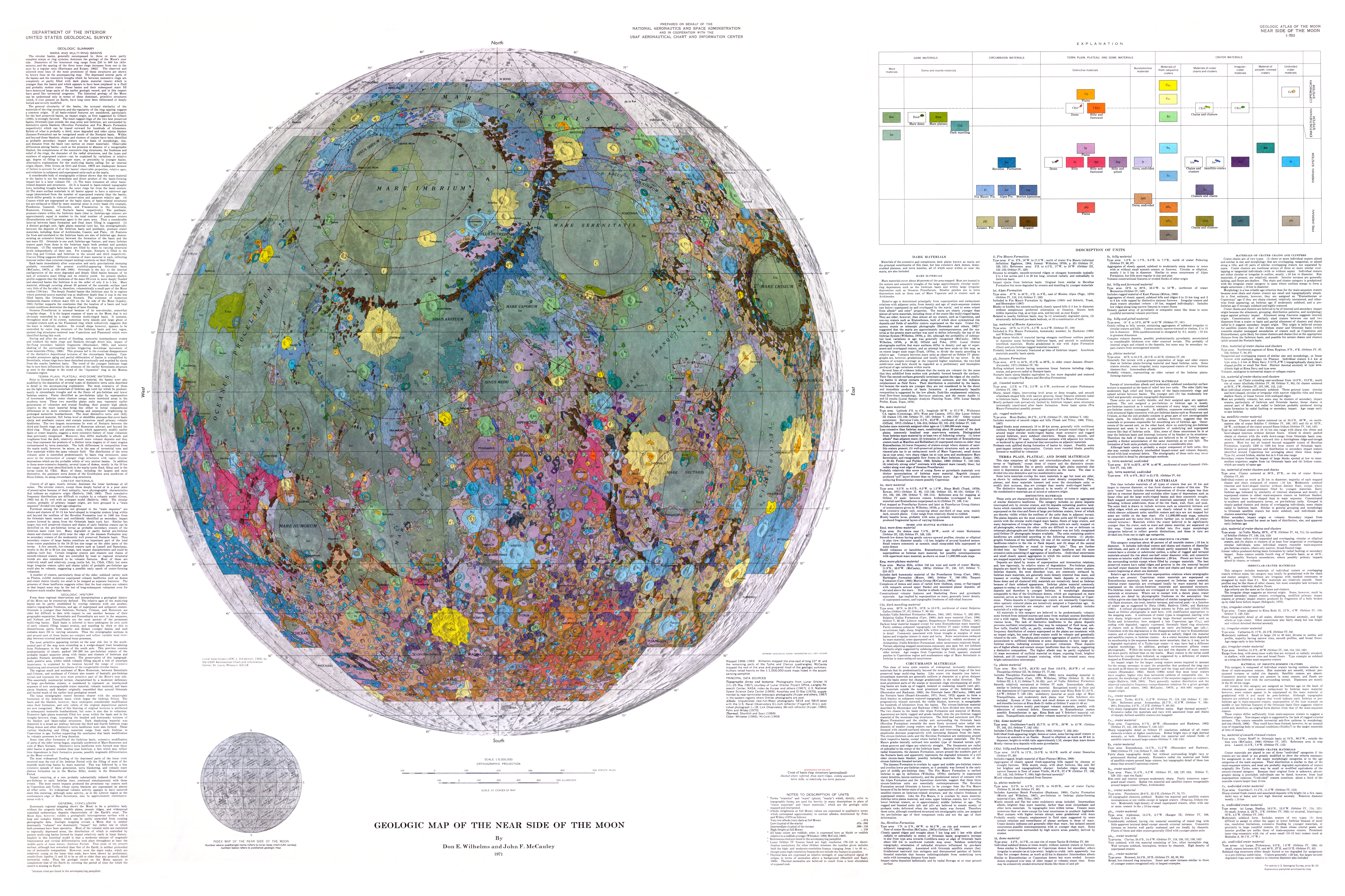
Geological map of the near side of the Moon (high resolution, click to zoom)

The lunar geologic timescale (or selenological timescale) divides the history of Earth's Moon into five generally recognized periods: the Copernican, Eratosthenian, Imbrian (Late and Early epochs), Nectarian, and Pre-Nectarian. The boundaries of this time scale are related to large impact events that have modified the lunar surface, changes in crater formation through time, and the size-frequency distribution of craters superposed on geological units. The absolute ages for these periods have been constrained by radiometric dating of samples obtained from the lunar surface. However, there is still much debate concerning the ages of certain key events, because correlating lunar regolith samples with geological units on the Moon is difficult, and most lunar radiometric ages have been highly affected by an intense history of bombardment.

== Lunar stratigraphy ==
Millions of years before present

The primary geological processes that have modified the lunar surface are impact cratering and volcanism, and by using standard stratigraphic principles (such as the law of superposition) it is possible to order these geological events in time. At one time, it was thought that the mare basalts might represent a single stratigraphic unit with a unique age, but it is now recognized that mare volcanism was an ongoing process, beginning as early as 4.2 Ga (1 Ga = 1 billion years ago) and continuing to perhaps as late as 1.2 Ga. Impact events are by far the most useful for defining a lunar stratigraphy as they are numerous and form in a geological instant. The continued effects of impact cratering over long periods of time modify the morphology of lunar landforms in a quantitative way, and the state of erosion of a landform can also be used to assign a relative age.

The lunar geological time scale has been divided into five periods (Pre-Nectarian, Nectarian, Imbrian, Eratosthenian, and Copernican) with one of these (the Imbrian) being subdivided into two epochs. These divisions of geological time are based on the recognition of convenient geomorphological markers, and as such, they should not be taken to imply that any fundamental changes in geological processes have occurred at these boundaries. The Moon is unique in the Solar System in that it is the only body (other than the Earth) for which we possess rock samples with a known geological context. By correlating the ages of samples obtained from the Apollo missions to known geological units, it has been possible to assign absolute ages to some of these geological periods. Some of the lunar time scale ages are uncertain or disputed. In many lunar highland regions, it is not possible to distinguish between Nectarian and Pre-Nectarian materials, and these deposits are sometimes labeled as just Pre-Imbrian.

Moon – Oceanus Procellarum ("Ocean of Storms")

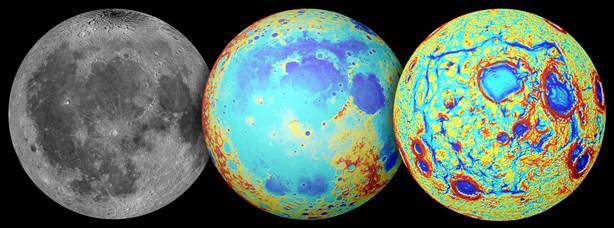
Ancient rift valleys – rectangular structure (visible – topography – GRAIL gravity gradients) (October 1, 2014)

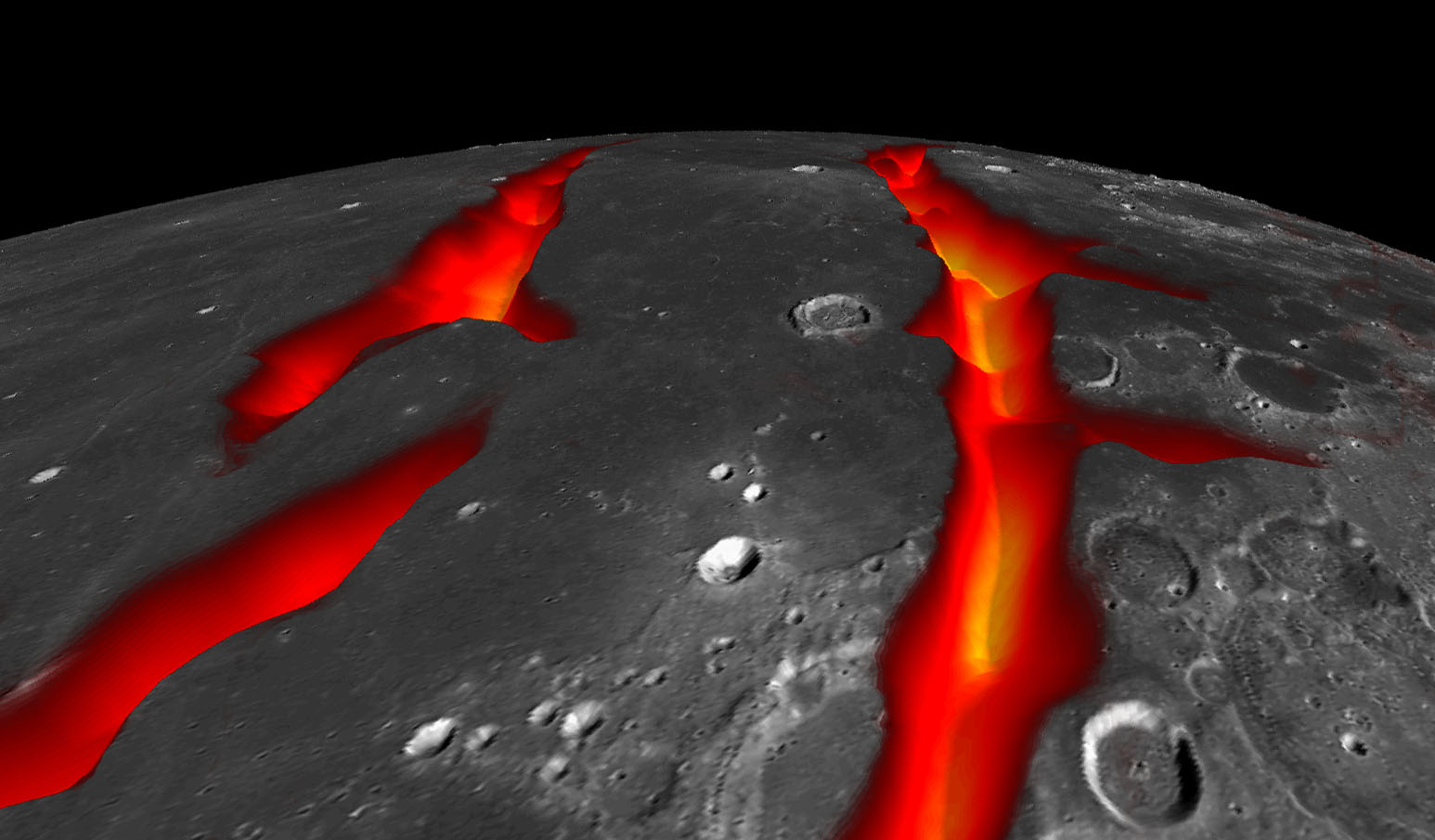
Ancient rift valleys – closeup (artist's concept)

=== Pre-Nectarian ===
The Pre-Nectarian period is defined from the point at which the lunar crust formed, to the time of the Nectaris impact event. Nectaris is a multi-ring impact basin that formed on the near side of the Moon, and its ejecta blanket serves as a useful stratigraphic marker. 30 impact basins from this period are recognized, the oldest of which is the South Pole–Aitken basin. This geological period has been informally subdivided into the Cryptic and Basin Groups 1–9, but these divisions are not used on any geological maps.

=== Nectarian ===
The Nectarian period encompasses all events that occurred between the formation of the Nectaris and Imbrium impact basins. 12 multi-ring impact basins are recognized in the Nectarian period, including the Serenitatis and Crisium basins. One of the scientific objectives of the Apollo 16 mission was to date material excavated by the Nectaris impact basin. Nevertheless, the age of the Nectaris basin is somewhat contentious, with the most frequently cited numbers being 3.92 Ga, and less frequently 3.85 Ga. In 2002, it was suggested that the Nectaris basin could be, in fact, much older at ~4.1 Ga.

=== Imbrian ===
The Imbrian period has been subdivided into Late and Early epochs (also termed the Upper Imbrian and Lower Imbrian, respectively). The Early Imbrian is defined as the time between the formation of the Imbrium and Orientale impact basins. The Imbrium basin is believed to have formed at 3.85 Ga, though a minority opinion places this event at 3.77 Ga. The Schrödinger basin is the only other multi-ring basin that is Lower Imbrian in age, and no large multi-ring basins formed after this epoch.

The Late Imbrian is defined as the time between the formation of the Orientale basin, and the time at which craters of a certain size (D_{L}) have been obliterated by erosional processes. The age of the Orientale basin has not been directly determined, though it must be older than 3.72 Ga (based on Upper Imbrian ages of mare basalts) and could be as old as 3.84 Ga based on the size-frequency distributions of craters superposed on Orientale ejecta. About two-thirds of the Moon's mare basalts erupted within the Upper Imbrian Series, with many of these lavas filling the depressions associated with older impact basins.

=== Eratosthenian ===
The base of the Eratosthenian period is defined by the time at which craters on a geological unit of a certain size D_{L} have been almost obliterated by erosional processes. The principal erosional agent on the Moon is impact cratering itself, though seismic modification could play a minor role as well. The absolute age of this boundary is not well defined, but is commonly quoted as being near 3.2 Ga. The younger boundary of this period is defined based on the recognition that freshly excavated materials on the lunar surface are generally bright and that they become darker over time as a result of space weathering processes. Operationally, this period was originally defined as the time at which impact craters lost their bright ray systems. This definition, however, has recently been subjected to some criticism as some crater rays are bright for compositional reasons that are unrelated to the amount of space weathering they have incurred. In particular, if the ejecta from a crater formed in the highlands (which is composed of bright anorthositic materials) is deposited on the low albedo mare, it will remain bright even after being space weathered.

=== Copernican ===
The Copernican period is the youngest geological period of the Moon. Originally, the presence of a bright ray system surrounding an impact crater was used to define Copernican units, but as mentioned above, this is complicated by the presence of compositional ray systems. The base of the Copernican period does not correspond to the formation of the impact crater Copernicus. The age of the base of the Copernican is not well constrained, but a commonly quoted number is 1.1 Ga. The Copernican extends until the present day.

== Relationship to Earth's geologic time scale ==
The divisions of the lunar geologic time scale are based on the recognition of a few convenient geomorphological markers. While these divisions are extremely useful for ordering geological events in a relative manner, it is important to realize that the boundaries do not imply any fundamental change of geological processes. Furthermore, as the oldest geological periods of the Moon are based exclusively on the times of individual impact events (in particular, Nectaris, Imbrium, and Orientale), these punctual events will most likely not correspond to any specific geological event on the other terrestrial planets, such as Mercury, Venus, Earth, or Mars.

Nevertheless, at least one notable scientific work has advocated using the lunar geological time scale to subdivide the Hadean eon of Earth's geologic time scale. In particular, it is sometimes found that the Hadean is subdivided into the Cryptic, Basin Groups 1–9, Nectarian, and Early Imbrian. This notation is not entirely consistent with the above lunar geologic time scale in that the Cryptic and Basin Groups 1–9 (both of which are only informal terms that are not used in geological maps) comprise the Pre-Nectarian period.

== See also ==
- Crater counting
- Geology of the Moon
- Geologic time scale (Earth)
- Impact crater
- Late Heavy Bombardment
