= Melanocyrillium =

Melanocyrillium Temporal range: 850 mya

Scientific classification
- Domain: Eukaryota
- Clade: incertae sedis
- Genus: †Melanocyrillium; Bloeser, 1985

Species
- M. fumbriatum; M. hexodiadema; M. horodyskii

Genus of Precambrian microfossils

Melanocyrillium is a Precambrian genus of vesicle-shaped (or vase-shaped) microfossils of uncertain affinity found in the Grand Canyon Supergroup and Togari Group of Tasmania. M. hexodiadema has been described as a "probable lobose amoeba".

Melanocyrillium microfossils are characterised by a hollow, vesicle- or vase-shaped morphology, sometimes exhibiting lobed or ornamented margins. The fossils are preserved as organic-walled microstructures typical of Precambrian acritarch-like assemblages.
