= Kakabekia =

Kakabekia Temporal range: Paleoproterozoic

Scientific classification
- Domain: incertae sedis
- Genus: Kakabekia; E.S. Barghoorn & S.A. Tyler, 1965

Type species
- Kakabekia umbellata Barghoorn & Tyler, 1965

Species
- K. barghoorniana S.M.Siegel, 1968; †K. eduardi Locq et al. 1979; †K. umbellata Barghoorn & Tyler, 1965

Ancient extant genus of algae with fossil evidence dating back 1.88 billion years

Kakabekia is a genus of microorganism. Kakabekia umbellata was first found in the 1.88 billion year old Gunflint Chert, and in 1966, a living member of the genus, Kakabekia barghoorniana was discovered in Wales - it is also found around the world, typically at 1000-2000m elevations. The roughly 2 billion year interval between these species has led some to call it the “oldest living fossil”.

== Anatomy ==
Kakabekia umbellata, as described by Barghoorn and Tyler in 1965 has an umbellate “mantle”, a stalk-like “stipe” and a “bulb” attached to it. Morphology of K. barghoorniana differs; it has a round structure with radial segmentation. They have a (possibly siliceous) ring around this structure. Feulgen-positive material (DNA) was seen in “clots” in K. barghooriniana cytoplasms, placing them in the Prokaryotes.

== Distribution ==
Kakabekia umbellata is known from the Gunflint chert of Canada. K. barghoorniana was first discovered in a soil sample cultured in ammonia from Harlech Castle, Wales in 1968. Further research found K. b. in Iceland and Alaska, as well as other locations in Wales.

== Metabolism ==
Kakabekia has an unusual metabolism. While it has no need for oxygen in its growth, it is not inhibited by it, like Clostridium. This, and the fact that it has some of the oxygen-utilising enzymes, suggest that it is a transition stage of oxygen-utilisation. Kakabekia barghoorni can only be grown in ammonia-rich conditions. This may reflect ancient atmosphere composition.

== Ontogeny ==
Barghoorn and Tyler propose an ontogeny where, starting from a spore, the stipe is grown which then produces the umbellate "mantle". In 1967, Licari and Cloud noted that many fossil "Huroniosporas" (a wastebasket taxon containing spore-like beings) have holes or "apertures" in them, suggesting a detachment point from Kakabekia stipes. However, based on observations of living K. barghoorniana, Siegel et al. came to a very different conclusion. They found that the spore-like bodies would grow into a larger, spherical organism, encircled by the ring described above. Then, divisions form radiating from the center, and a stipe grows and releases a spore. After about 10 days, the organism degenerates and dies (senescence).
