= Basin Groups =

9 subdivisions of the lunar Pre-Nectarian geologic period

Basin Groups refers to 9 subdivisions of the lunar Pre-Nectarian geologic period.

== Definition ==
The motivation for creating the Basin Groups subdivisions was to place 30 pre-Nectarian impact basins into 9 relative age groups. The relative age of the first basin in each group is based on crater densities and superposition relationships, whereas the other basins are included based on weaker grounds. Basin Group 1 has no official age for its base, and the boundary between Basin Group 9 and the Nectarian period is defined by the formation of the Nectaris impact basin.

The age of the Nectaris basin is somewhat contentious, with the most frequently cited numbers placing it at 3.92 Ga, or more infrequently at 3.85 Ga. Recently, however, it has been suggested that the Nectaris basin could be, in fact, much older and might have formed at ~4.1 Ga. Basin Groups are not used as a geologic period on any of the United States Geological Survey lunar geologic maps. Basin Groups 1-9 and the earlier (informal) Cryptic era together make up the totality of the Pre-Nectarian period.

Millions of years before present
