= Geology of Sweden =

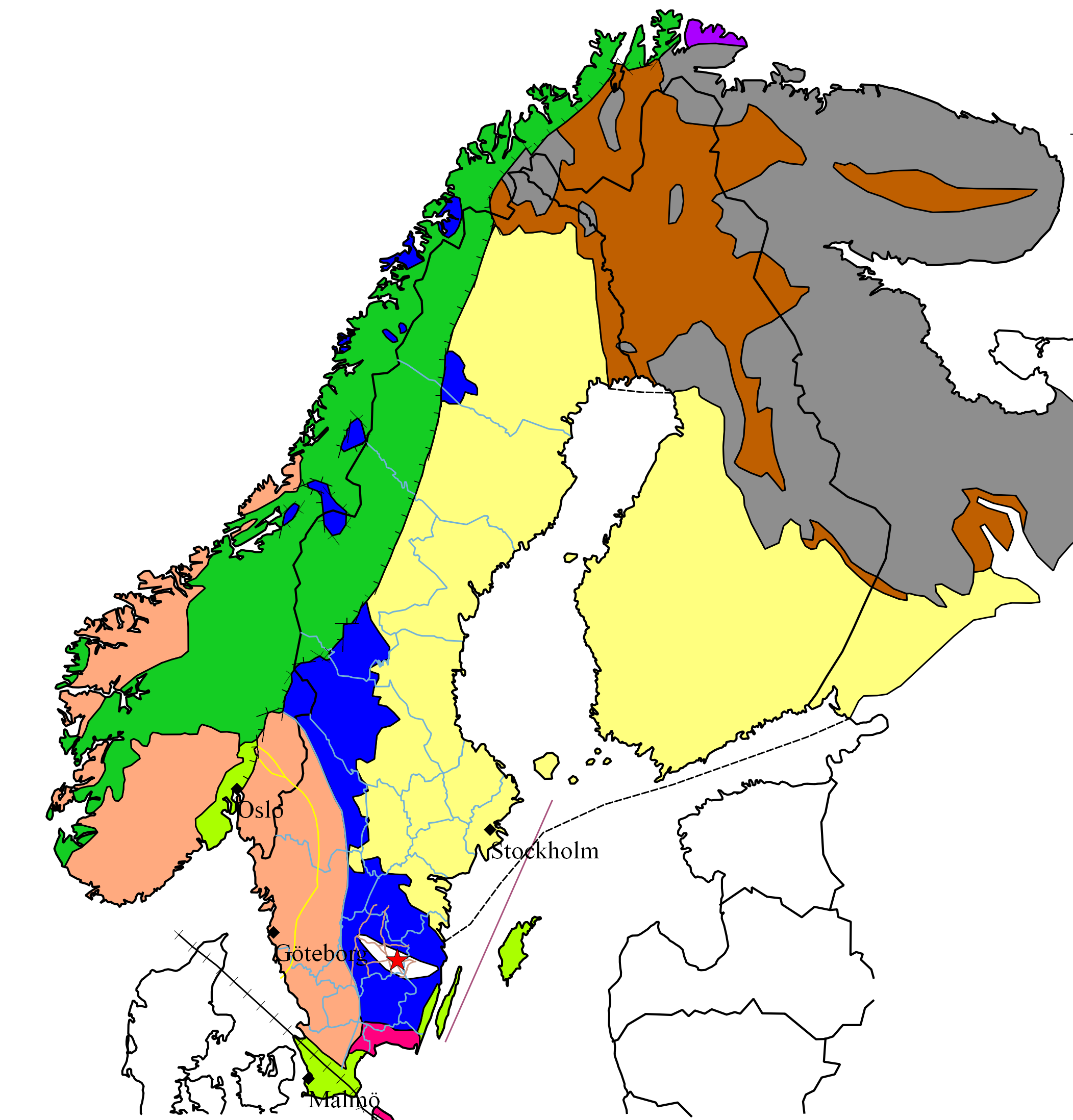
Geological map of Fennoscandia. Archean rocks of the Karelia, Belomorian and Kola domains Proterozoic rocks of the Karelia and Kola domains Svecofennian Domain Transscandinavian Igneous Belt Timanide Orogen Sveconorwegian Orogen inc. the Western Gneiss Region Caledonian nappes

The geology of Sweden is the regional study of rocks, minerals, tectonics, natural resources and groundwater in the country. The oldest rocks in Sweden date to more than 2.5 billion years ago in the Precambrian. Complex orogeny mountain building events and other tectonic occurrences built up extensive metamorphic crystalline basement rock that often contains valuable metal deposits throughout much of the country. Metamorphism continued into the Paleozoic after the Snowball Earth glaciation as the continent Baltica collided with an island arc and then the continent Laurentia. Sedimentary rocks are most common in southern Sweden with thick sequences from the last 250 million years underlying Malmö and older marine sedimentary rocks forming the surface of Gotland.

== Stratigraphy, tectonics and geologic history ==
The oldest rocks in Sweden date to the Archean, more than 2.5 billion years ago. Archean crystalline basement rocks are restricted to a few areas in the far north and are mainly orthogneiss and paragneiss migmatite. Relatively few age studies had been conducted on the rocks by the late 1990s, although they are interpreted as being more than 2.7 billion years old. Studies on younger Paleoproterozoic intrusions in the Skellefte district suggest that the intrusions derived from the Archean parent rock along a line stretching 100 kilometers northeast from the area. However, in south-central and southeast Sweden, the younger rock does not appear to derive from the Archean rocks.

Northern Sweden has greenstone belts made up of mafic volcanic rocks with intercalations of komatiite, quartzite, graphite schist and Lapponian marble. Uranium-lead dating in the lower part of the Kiruna greenstone belt indicates mafic volcanism started in the Archean around 2.7 billion years ago and ended before the intrusion of mafic dikes 2.2 billion years ago. Quartzite, feldspathic meta-sandstone, mica schist and Jatulian dolomite are the other dominant metasupracrustal rocks in the area.

The Svecokarelian Orogeny between 1.95 and 1.85 billion years ago deposited the metavolcanic and metasedimentary Svecofennian-Kalevian rocks, along with calc-alkaline granitoid intrusions. Felsic metavolcanic rocks from 1.9-1.88 billion years ago are the uppermost sequence in the Kiruna area. The region also has some meta-greywacke and mica schist.

Dating of rocks in the Finnish part of the Fennoscandian Shield suggests that the rocks there are somewhat older, forming starting two billion years ago. There are two felsic volcanic complexes in the Skellefte district south of the greenstone belts, spanning into the Arvidsjaur district. These rocks deposited below water and were later affected by low-grade metamorphism. South of the Skellefte district in north-central Sweden, in the Bothnian Basin, metagrayacke interlayers with metavolcanic rocks and metamorphosed under high pressure to paragneiss and migmatite.

=== Proterozoic (2.5 billion-539 million years ago) ===
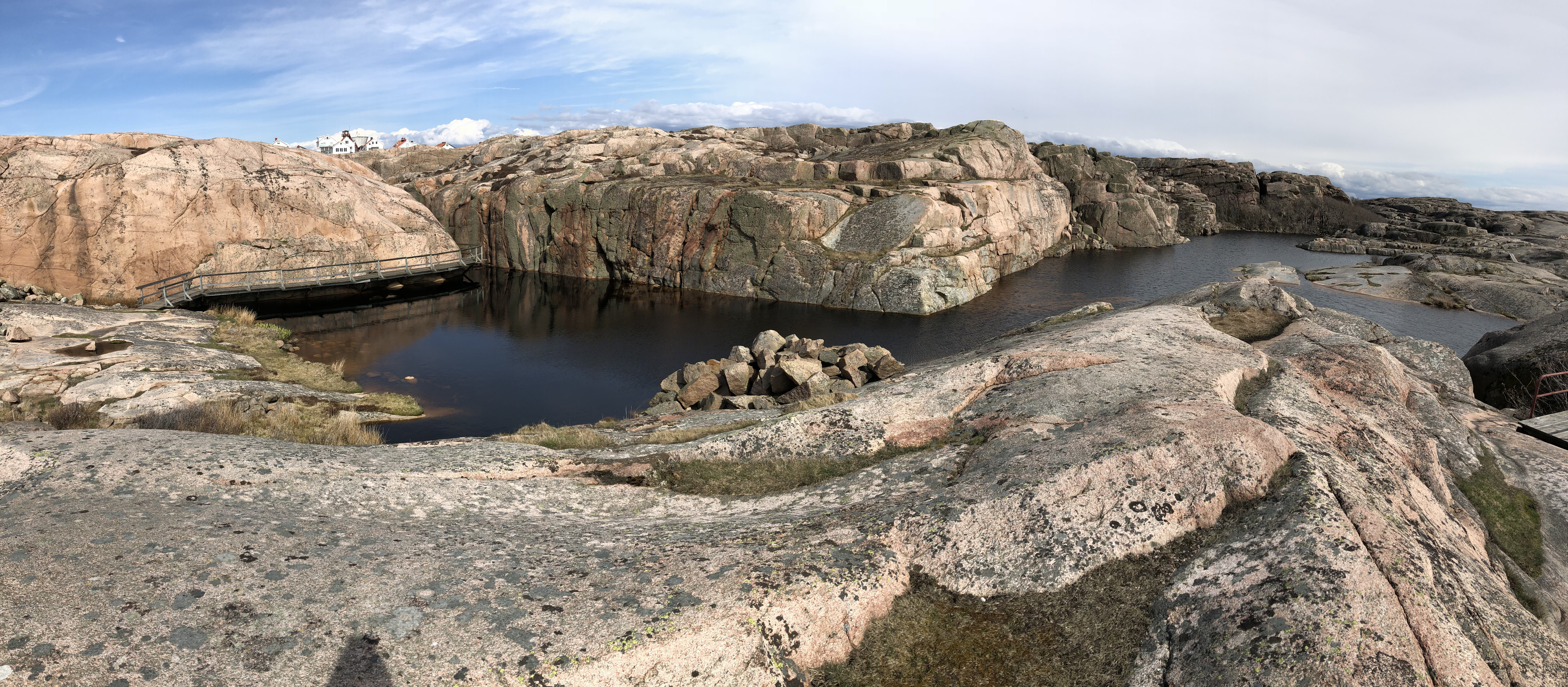
Granite, in Smögen (southwestern Sweden), formed during the Sveconorwegian orogeny

The Paleoproterozoic rocks emplaced by the Svecokarelian orogeny were intruded by granite and mafic dikes, overlain with clastic sedimentary rocks and in some places, basalt. The granites range between 1.58 and 1.4 million years ago and some are rapakivi granite associated with syenite, gabbro and anorthosite. Swarms of mafic dikes are dated to 1.56-1.5, 1.25-1.2 and one billion to 900 million years ago, striking north-northwest in the western part of the Svecokarelian orogen.

The Sveconorwegian Orogeny is 500 kilometers long and 180 kilometers wide. West of its frontal deformation zone, geologists divide the orogen into Eastern, Median and Western segments, separated by ductile deformation zones, striking north-south. These ductile zones are identified as the Mylonite Zone, between the Eastern and Median segments and the Gota Alv Zone-Dalskand Boundary Thrust. Along the southwest coast of Sweden, the Mylonite Zone separates high-pressure granulite and charnockite from medium-grade metamorphic rocks in the Median zone. For the most part, the rocks in the orogen were affected first by the Gothian tectonic event, 1.65-1.56 billion years ago, and then by the Sveconorwegian Orogeny from 1.1 to 900 million years ago.

TIB granitoids dominate the eastern segment north of Lake Vattern. In the western segment, metavolcanic rocks and metagraywacke from 1.76 billion years ago is most common. The Amal-Horred belt contains younger intermediate metavolcanic rocks, intruded by calc-alkaline granitoids.

Granite, syenite and mafic intrusions are distributed throughout the broader grouping of Sveconorwegian rocks, which intruded before the Gothian event, but before extensive deformation took place. Aside from a skarn iron oxide and manganese deposit at Langban and some copper, lead and zinc mineralization, the Sveconorwegian rocks tend to be poor in metal resources. However, kyanite quartzite, slate, kaolin and pure quartz are sometimes mined along with granite.

In the Neoproterozoic, the Visingso Group rocks, including sandstone, conglomerate, siltstone and shale deposited.

=== Paleozoic (539-251 million years ago) ===
In six areas in south-central Sweden, early Paleozoic rocks lie unconformably atop the Fennoscandian Shield, made up of 200 meter thick Cambrian shallow marine quartz arenite, as well as black shales from the Ordovician, and Silurian limestone, sandstone and shale. Early Cambrian sandstone is preserved in some places in fractures in the Precambrian bedrock. The bedrock of Gotland is almost exclusively Silurian limestone and shale.

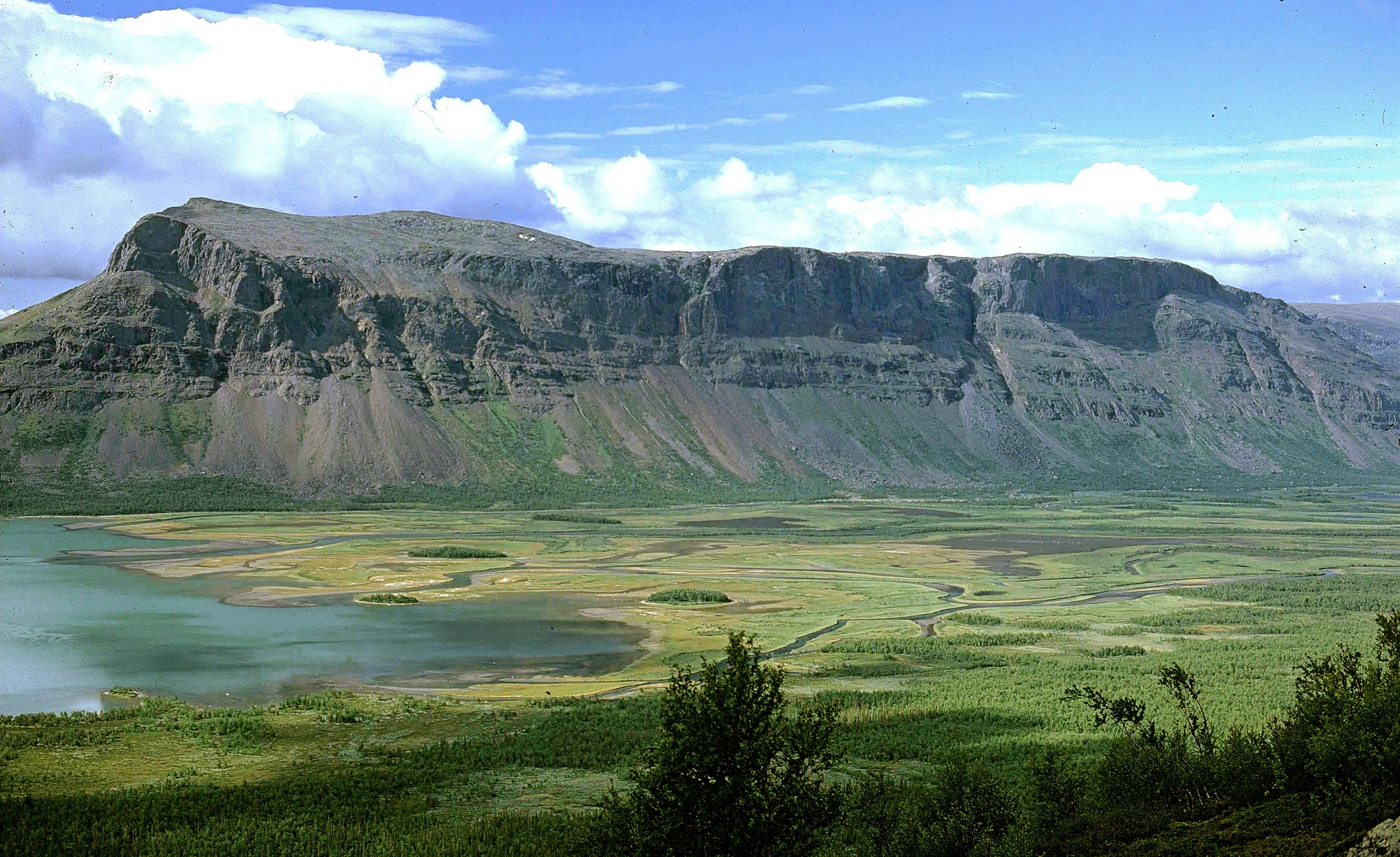
Tjakkeli, a mountain in Norrbotten County (northern Sweden), is made of mylonitised syenitoid-granitic igneous rock above quartz arenite sedimentary rock (about 1,880 to 490 million years old), originally formed in another location and transported eastward during the Caledonian orogeny, about 450 million years ago, as part of a large nappe fold, thrust on top of the underlying Svecokarelian basement (about 1,920 to 1,870 million years old)

The Swedish Caledonides formed due to an orogeny in the early Paleozoic, along the western margin of Sweden approximately 510 to 400 million years ago. The Caledonides are 900 kilometers long and 120 kilometers wide and is dominated by a series of thrust sheets, on top of Precambrian allochthon formations. Tectonic shortening at the margin of the ancient continent Baltica produced the Lower Allochthon, Middle Allochthon and Upper Allochthon as well as the Seve Nappes. Prior to tectonic shortening, the margin of the continent extended 400 kilometers further west.

The Lower Allochthon is made up of foreland fold-and-thrust belt rocks and contains slabs of Precambrian crystalline rock and clastic sedimentary and limestone cover rocks. The Middle Allochthon is similar, but contains Neoproterozoic metasedimentary rocks, many of which show glacial origins. The Sarv Nappe—the highest thrust sheet—contains dolerite from 600 million years ago. The overlying Seve Nappe formed along a continent-ocean transition, with mafic and ultramafic meta-igneous rocks. These rocks were buried to a depth of 60 kilometers. As the Caledonides built up, deformation increased, forming eclogite in the middle Ordovician.

The complex tectonic evolution of the Caledonides built up lead-zinc sulfides from the Neoproterozoic to the Cambrian in quartz arenite, along with subsequent, more widely distributed zinc, copper, gold and lead deposits. The Lower and Middle Allochthon contain valuable quantities of metasandstone and limestone.

The Caledonides formed during the breakup of a supercontinent in the Neoproterozoic as Baltica became an independent continent after the Snowball Earth glaciation. The orogeny occurred as the Iapetus Ocean closed, with the collision between Baltica and an island arc. During the Silurian, Baltica was situated on the equator and the subduction of oceanic crust had closed the gap with Laurentia (proto-North America), beginning the formation of the new supercontinent Pangaea.

=== Mesozoic-Cenozoic (251 million years ago-present) ===
The Tornquist Zone in southern Sweden is a zone of faults, bounding Fennoscandian Shield, have been active since the Carboniferous. Early Paleozoic rocks in this area are up to one kilometer thick, continuing upward into Mesozoic and Cenozoic shale, siltstone and sandstone. The Late Cretaceous and early Cenozoic is marked by limestone two to three kilometers thick, in and around Malmö.

== Mineral resources ==
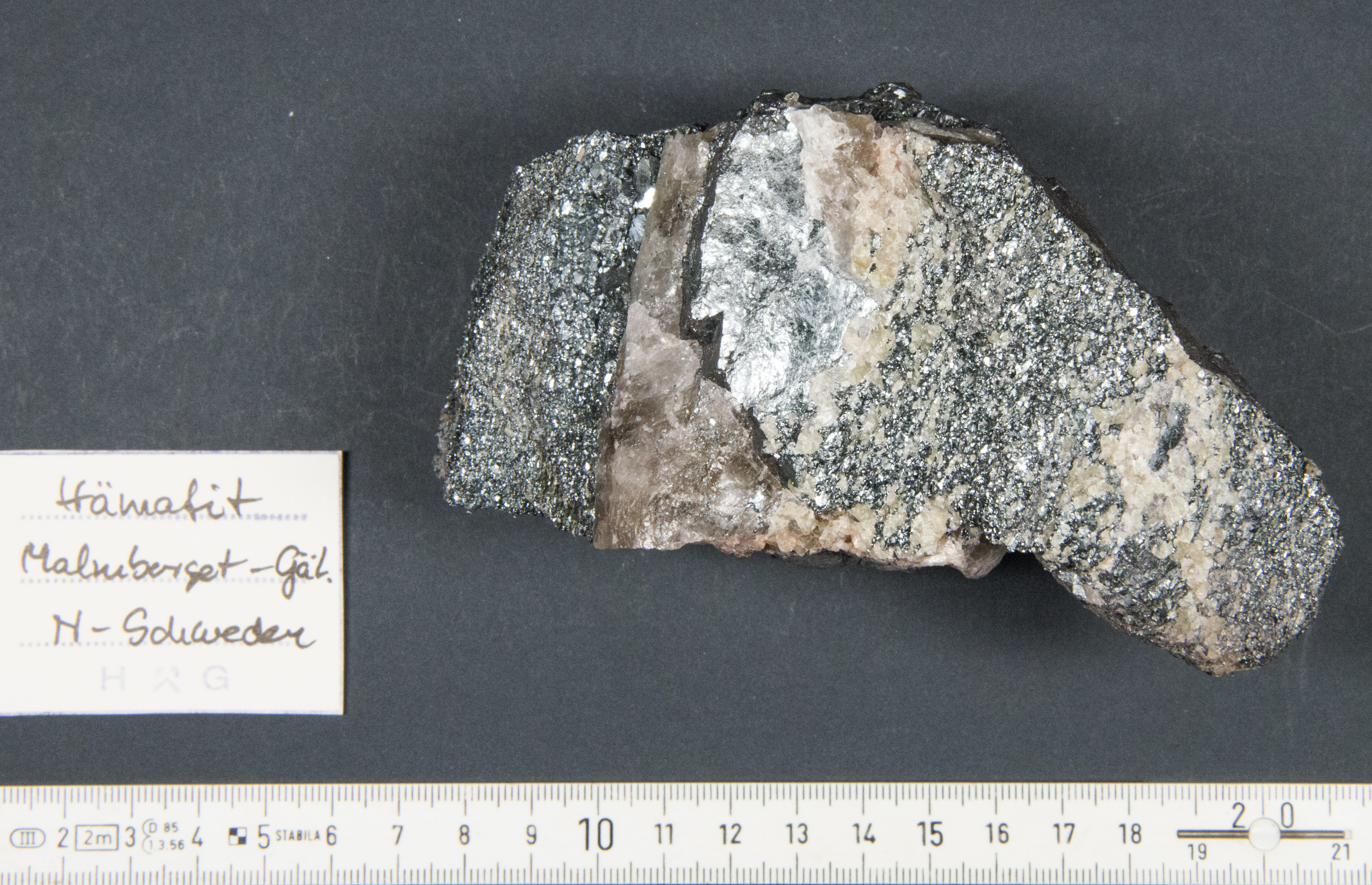
Iron ore (hematite and magnetite) from Gällivare

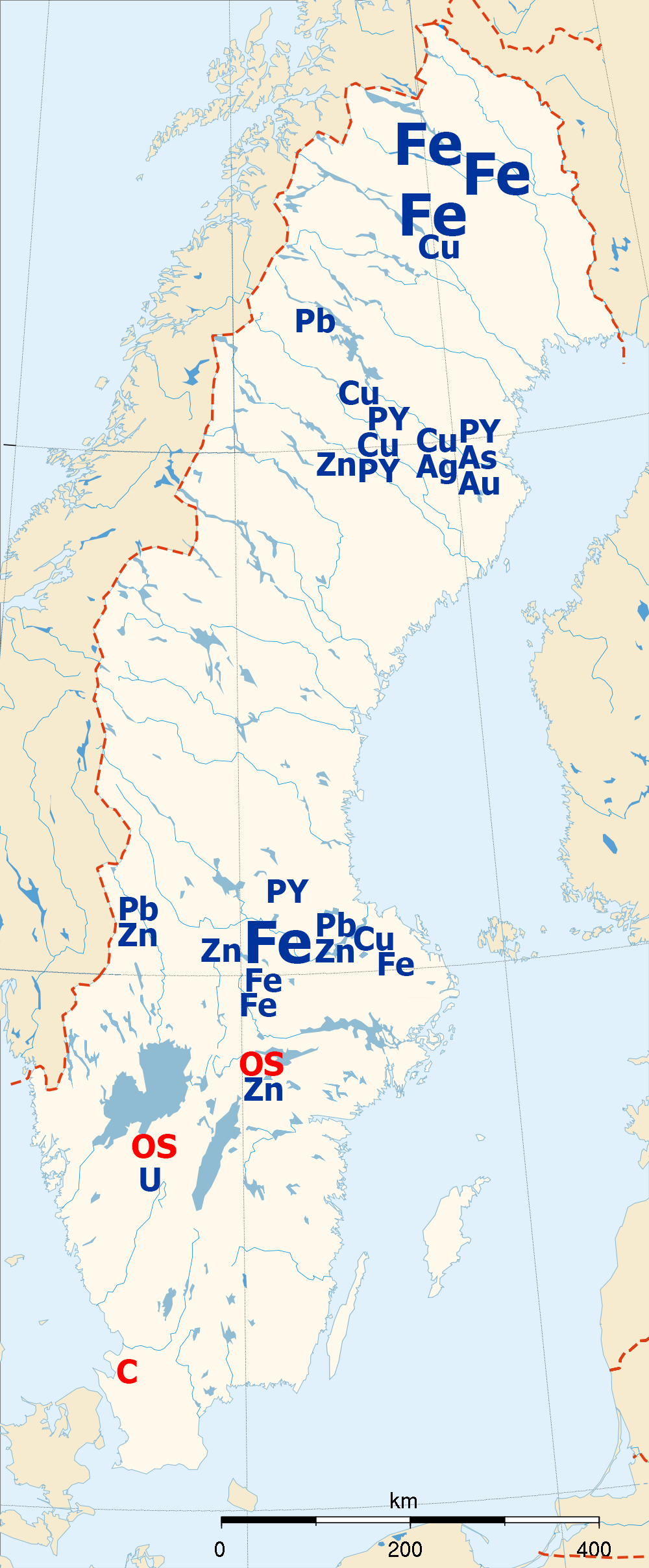
Map of natural resources - metals are in blue (Fe, Cu, Zn, As (semi-metal), Ag, W, Au, Pb, U; PY — pyrite), fossil fuels are in red (C — coal, OS — oil shale)

Copper, gold and iron have been mined in Sweden since the Middle Ages. For instance, the Falun copper mine in the Bergslagen district had been mined for over 700 years at the time of its closure in the 1990s. Historically, the Bergslagen area has had the most extensive mining—with over 3000 ore workings in the 18th and 19th centuries. Since the beginning of the 20th century, the discovery of metasupracrustral and greenstone belt rocks in northern Sweden has opened up new resources, such as the Kiruna iron ore, Viscaria copper-iron deposit and the Aitik gold and silver deposit. The Skellefte district is known for a massive sulfide deposit hosted in metavolcanic rocks, together with gold mineralization in quartz veins. The Swedish Caledonides also host massive sulfide deposits. In 1997, only 17 metal mines were active, even though 400 significant metal deposits were known throughout the country.

Non-metallic resources include Paleozoic limestone extracted on Gotland in the 1100s through the 1500s for use in city walls and house throughout the Hanseatic League. In the early 20th century, mines extracted black shale in south-central Sweden for energy.

== Bibliography ==
- Moores, E.M.; Fairbridge, Rhodes W. (1997). Encyclopedia of European & Asian Regional Geology. Springer.
