= Baltic Shield =

Ancient segment of Earth's crust

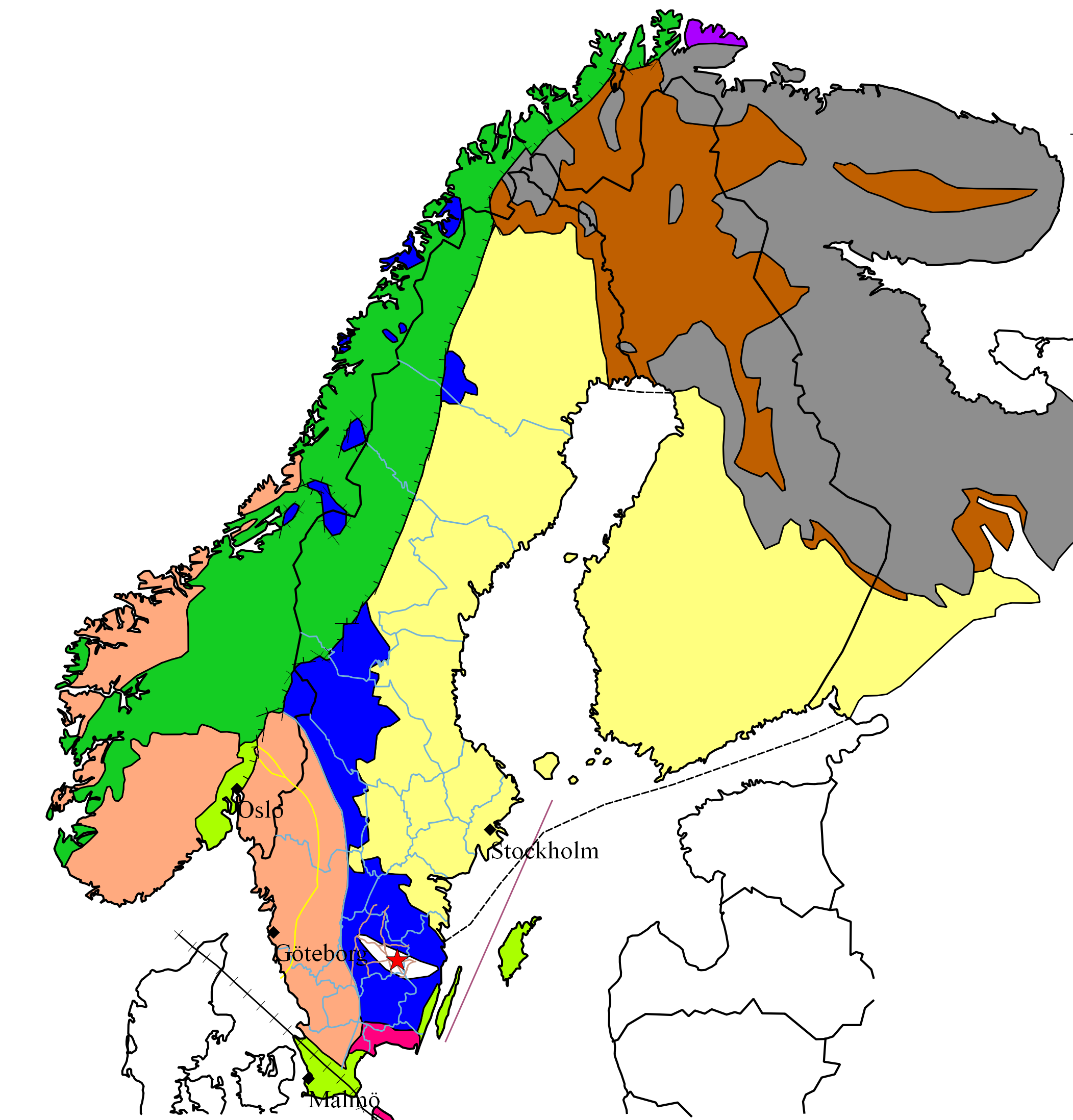
Geological map of Fennoscandia Archean rocks of the Karelia, Belomorian and Kola domains Proterozoic rocks of the Karelia and Kola domains Svecofennian Domain Transscandinavian Igneous Belt Timanide Orogen Sveconorwegian Orogen (including the Western Gneiss Region) Caledonian nappes

The Baltic Shield (or Fennoscandian Shield) is a segment of the Earth's crust belonging to the East European Craton, representing a large part of Fennoscandia, northwestern Russia and the northern Baltic Sea. It is composed mostly of Archean and Proterozoic gneisses and greenstone which have undergone numerous deformations through tectonic activity. It contains the oldest rocks of the European continent with a thickness of 250–300 km.

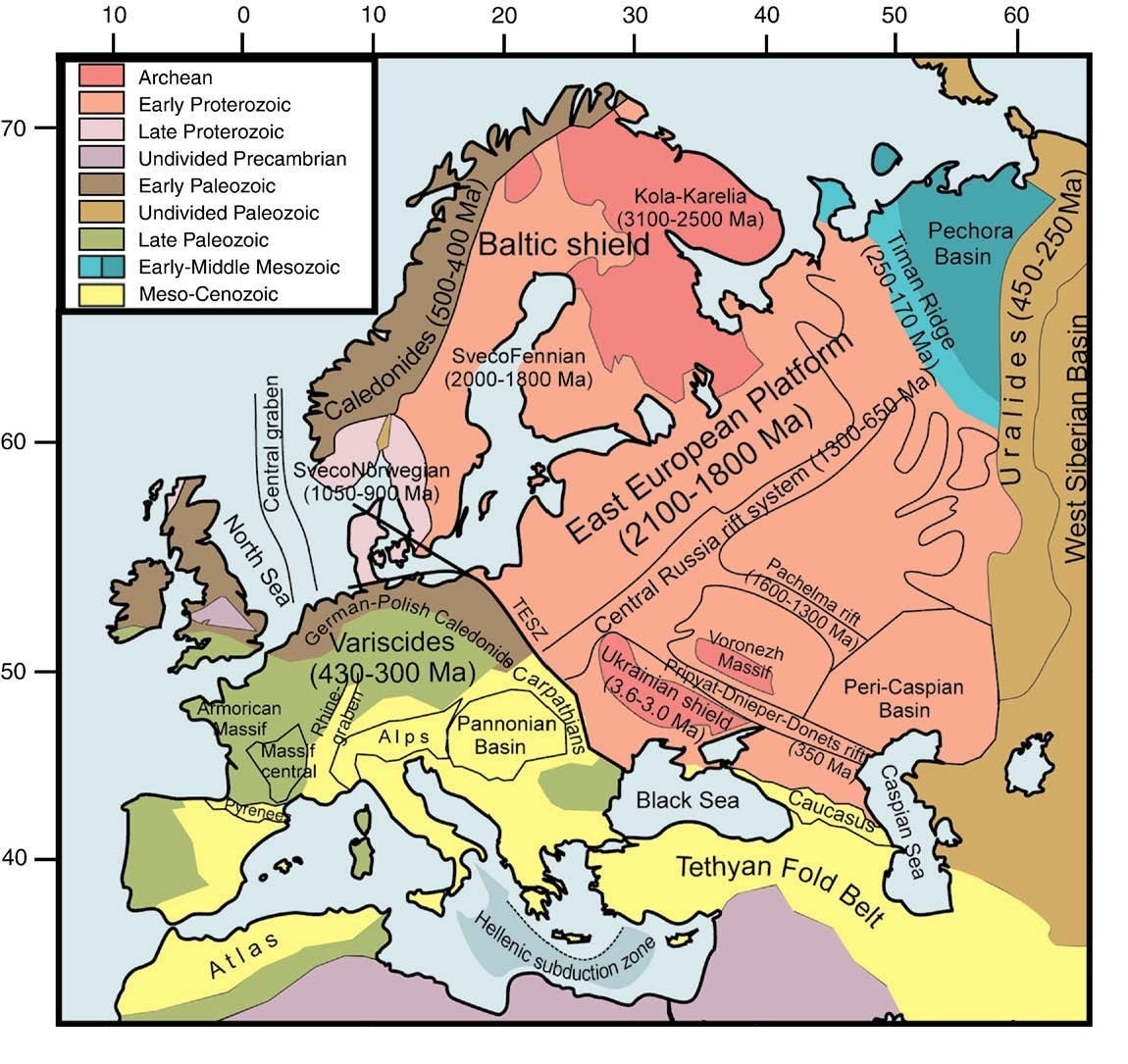
Baltic Shield in the tectonic setting of Europe

The Baltic Shield is divided into five provinces: the Svecofennian and Sveconorwegian (or Southwestern gneiss) provinces in Fennoscandia, and the Karelian, Belomorian and Kola provinces in Russia. The latter three are divided further into several blocks and complexes and contain the oldest of the rocks, at 3100–2500 Ma (million years) old. The youngest rocks belong to the Sveconorwegian province, at 1700–900 Ma old.

Thought to be formerly part of an ancient continent, the Baltic Shield grew in size through collisions with neighbouring crustal fragments. The mountains created by these tectonic processes have since been eroded to their bases, the region being largely flat today. Through five successive Pleistocene glaciations and subsequent retreats, the Baltic Shield has been scoured clean of its overlying sediments, leaving expansive areas (most within Scandinavia) exposed. It is therefore of importance to geophysicists studying the geologic history and dynamics of eastern Europe.

The scouring and compression of the Baltic Shield by glacial movements created the area's many lakes and streams, the land retaining only a thin layer of sandy sediment collected in depressions and eskers. Most soil consists of moraine, a grayish yellow mixture of sand and rocks, with a thin layer of humus on top. Vast forests, featuring almost exclusively the three species pine, spruce and birch, dominate the landscape, clearly demarcating its boundaries. The soil is acidic and has next to no carbonates such as limestone. The scouring by the ancient glaciers and the acidity of the soil have destroyed all palaeontologically interesting materials, such as fossils.

The Baltic Shield yields important industrial minerals and ores, such as those of iron, nickel, copper and platinum group metals. Because of its similarity to the Canadian Shield and cratons of southern Africa and Western Australia, the Baltic Shield had long been a suspected source of diamonds and gold. Currently, the Central Lapland Greenstone Belt in the north is considered to be an unexplored area that has the potential to hold exploitable gold deposits.

Recent exploration has revealed a significant number of diamond-bearing kimberlites in the Kola Peninsula, and (possibly extensive) deposits of gold in Finland.

== Denudation chronology ==
Mountains that existed in Precambrian time were eroded into a subdued terrain already during the late Mesoproterozoic, when the rapakivi granites intruded. Further erosion made the terrain rather flat at the time of the deposition of Jotnian sediments. With Proterozoic erosion amounting to tens of kilometers, many of the Precambrian rocks seen today in Finland are the "roots" of ancient massifs. The last major leveling event resulted in the formation of the Sub-Cambrian peneplain in late Neoproterozoic time.

Laurentia and Baltica collided in the Silurian and Devonian, producing a Himalayas-sized mountain range named the Caledonian Mountains roughly over the same area as the present-day Scandinavian Mountains. During the Caledonian orogeny, Finland was likely a sunken foreland basin covered by sediments; subsequent uplift and erosion would have eroded all of these sediments. While Finland has remained buried or very close to sea-level since the formation of the Sub-Cambrian peneplain, some further relief was formed by a slight uplift, resulting in the carving of valleys by rivers. The slight uplift also means that in places the uplifted peneplain can be traced as summit accordances.

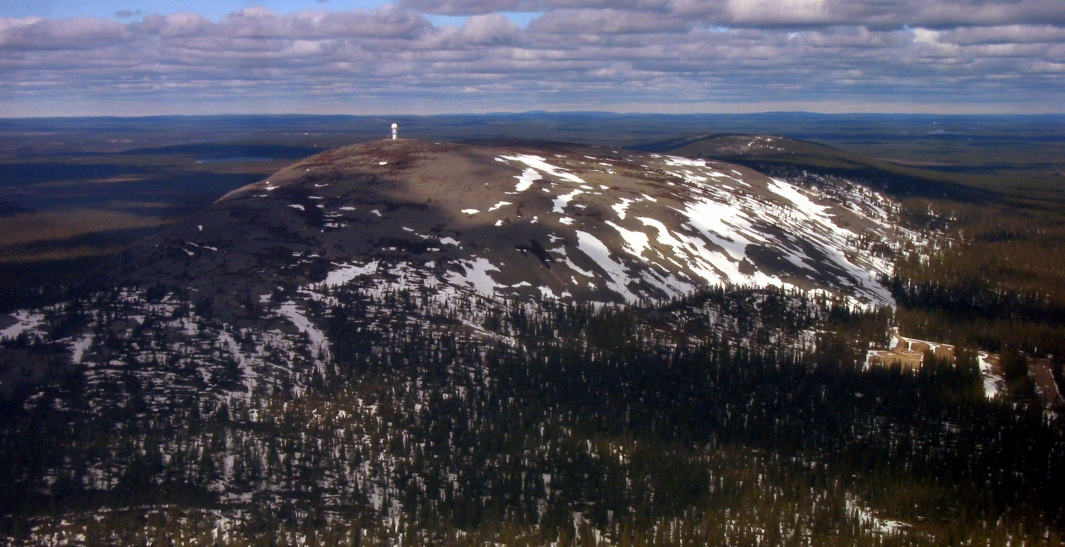
Luosto, an inselberg in Finnish Lapland

Denudation in the Mesozoic is counted at most in hundreds of meters. The inselberg plain of Finnish Lapland is estimated to have formed in Late Cretaceous or Paleogene times, either by pediplanation or etchplanation. Any older Mesozoic surface in Finnish Lapland is unlikely to have survived erosion. Further west, the Muddus plains and its inselbergs formed—also by etching and pediplanation—in connection to the uplift of the northern Scandinavian Mountains in the Paleogene.

The northern Scandinavian Mountains had their main uplift in the Paleogene, while the southern Scandinavian Mountains and the South Swedish Dome were largely uplifted in the Neogene. The uplift events were concurrent with the uplift of Eastern Greenland. All of these uplifts are thought to be related to far-field stresses in Earth's lithosphere. According to this view, the Scandinavian Mountains and the South Swedish Dome can be likened to a giant anticlinal lithospheric folds. Folding could have been caused by horizontal compression acting on a thin to thick crustal transition zone (as are all passive margins). The uplift of the Scandinavian Mountains resulted in the progressive tilt of northern Sweden, contributing to create the parallel drainage pattern of that region. As the South Swedish Dome uplifted, this resulted in the formation of a piedmonttreppen and the obstruction of the Eridanos River, diverting it to the south.

While being repeatedly covered by glaciers during the Quaternary (last 2.58 million years), Fennoscandia has seen little effect on any changes in its topography from glacial erosion. Denudation during this time is geographically highly variable but averages tens of meters. The southern coast of Finland, Åland and the Stockholm archipelago were subject to considerable glacial erosion in the form of scraping during the Quaternary. The Quaternary ice ages resulted in the glacier's erosion of irregularly distributed weak rock, weathered rock mantles, and loose materials. When the ice masses retreated, eroded depressions turned into the many lakes seen now in Finland and Sweden. Fractures in the bedrock were particularly affected by weathering and erosion, leaving as result straight sea and lake inlets.

== See also ==
- Geology of Finland
- Geology of Norway
- Geology of Sweden
- Kola Superdeep Borehole
- List of shields and cratons
- Nickel deposits of Finland
- Shield (geology)
- Swedish iron ore (WWII)
