= Belomorian Province =

Area of the Fennoscandian Shield spanning parts of Northwest Russia

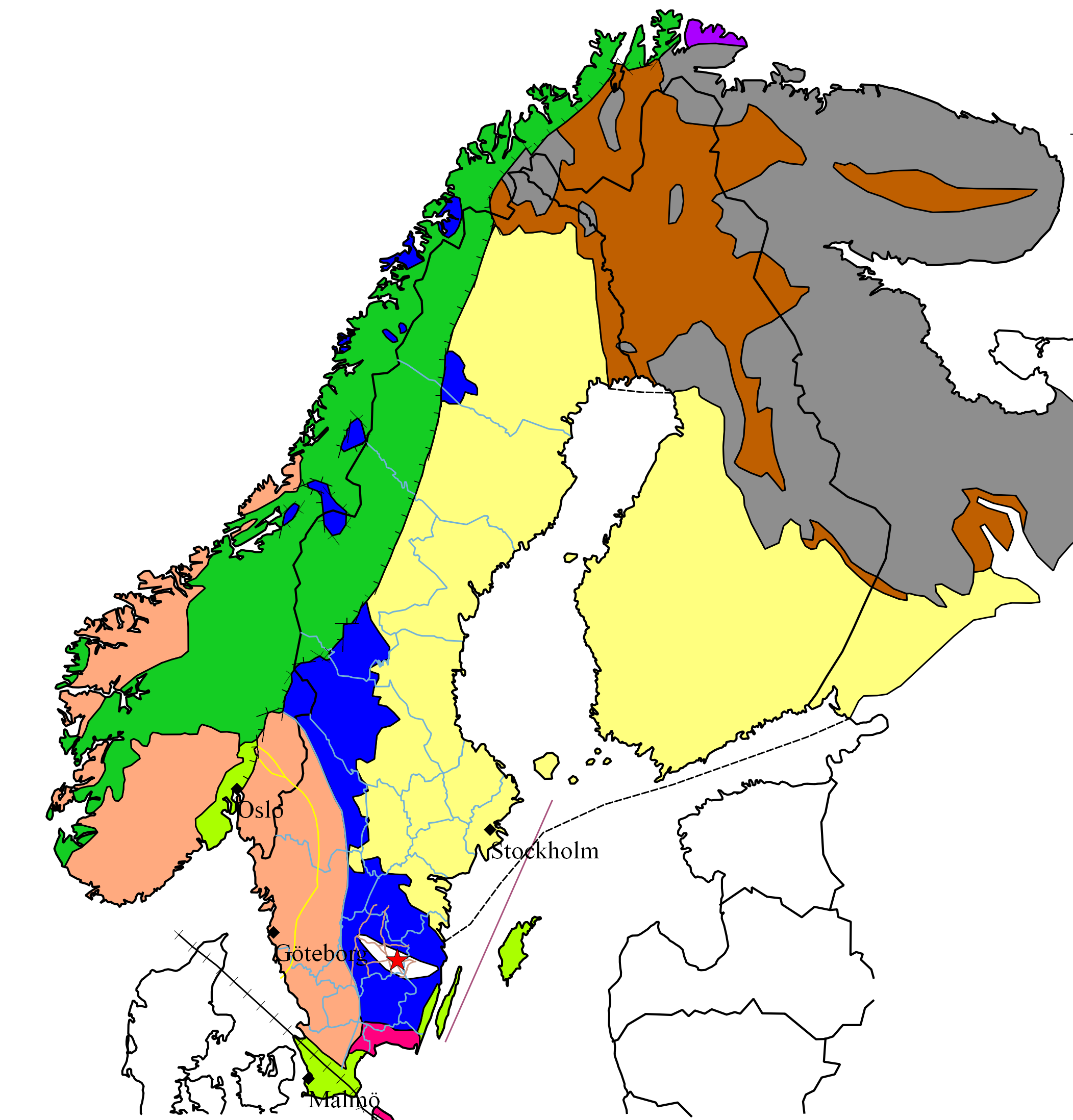
Geological map of Fennoscandia: Archean rocks of the Karelia, Belomorian, and Kola domains Proterozoic rocks of the Karelia and Kola domains Svecofennian Domain Transscandinavian Igneous Belt Timanide Orogen Sveconorwegian Orogen (including the Western Gneiss Region) Caledonian nappes

The Belomorian Province (also known as Belomorian Terrane, Belomorian Domain, Belomorian orogen, and Belomorides) is an area of the Fennoscandian Shield spanning the parts of the Republic of Karelia and Murmansk Oblast in Northwest Russia. The province is named after the Russian name for the White Sea. The main rock types are orthogneiss (derived from the tonalite-trondhjemite-granodiorite association), greenstone and paragneiss. Although these rocks formed in the Mesoarchean and Neoarchean, they were disturbed by tectonic movements and heat 1900–1800 million years ago in the Paleoproterozoic. Located between the Kola and Karelian domains the collision of these two blocks would have caused the disturbance. According to one view the Belomorian Province could just be a more metamorphosed part of the Karelian Province to the west.
