= Kola Province =

Geological area of the Fennoscandian Shield spanning Russia, Finland, and Norway

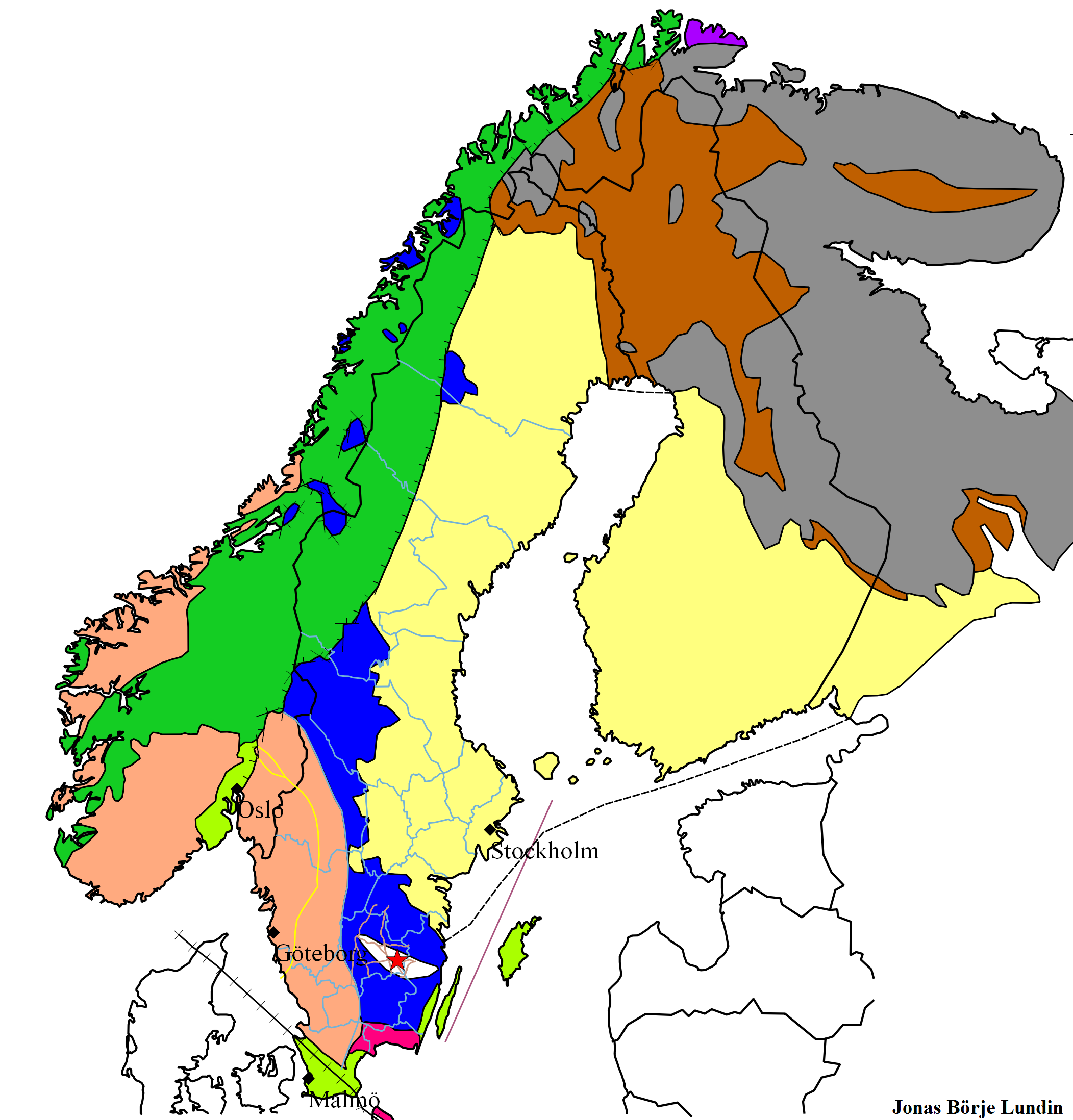
Geological map of the Scandinavian Peninsula and Fennoscandia: Archean rocks of the Karelia, Belomorian, and Kola domains Proterozoic rocks of the Karelia and Kola domains Svecofennian Domain Transscandinavian Igneous Belt Timanide Orogen Sveconorwegian Domain inc. the Western Gneiss Region Caledonian nappes

The Kola Province (also known as Kola Block and Kola Domain) is an area of the Fennoscandian Shield spanning an area near the borders of Russia, Finland, and Norway, including the bulk of its namesake Kola Peninsula. The continental crust that makes up the province is a collage of Mesoarchean and Neoarchean age with some lesser amounts being of Paleoproterozoic age.
