= Transscandinavian Igneous Belt =

Major lithological unit of the Baltic Shield

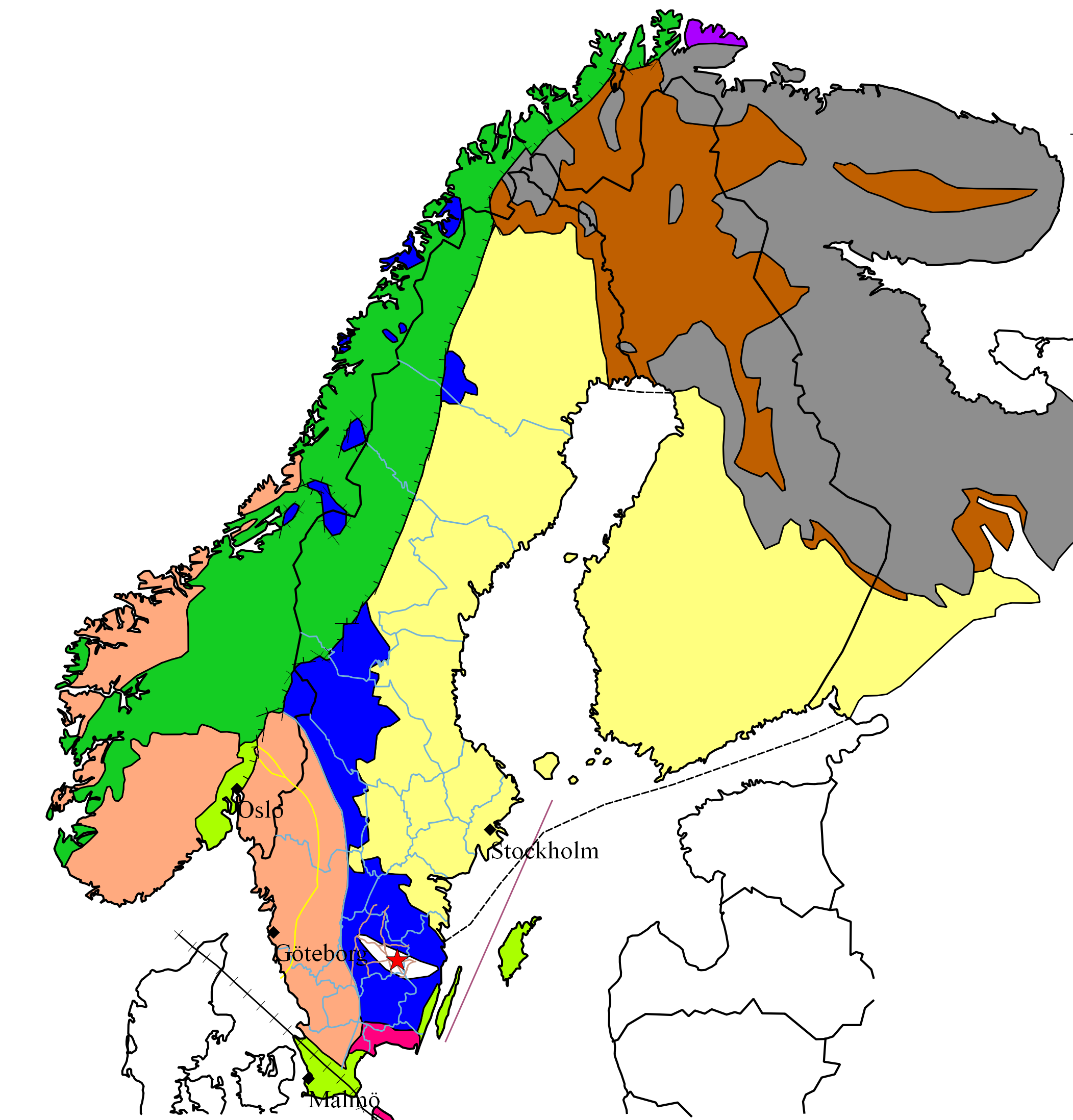
Geological map of the Scandinavian Peninsula and Fennoscandia: Archean rocks of the Karelia, Belomorian, and Kola domains Proterozoic rocks of the Karelia and Kola domains Svecofennian Domain Transscandinavian Igneous Belt Timanide Orogen Sveconorwegian Orogen (including the Western Gneiss Region) Caledonian nappes

The Transscandinavian Igneous Belt (Swedish: Transskandinaviska magmatiska bältet), abbreviated TIB, is one of the major lithological units of the Baltic Shield. It consists of a series of batholiths in Sweden and Norway forming a ca. 1400 km long belt running from Lofoten, Norway, in the north to Blekinge, Sweden, in the south. The Transscandinavian Igneous Belt and its rocks solidified from magma between 1810 and 1650 million years ago during the Mesoproterozoic. The Transscandinavian Igneous Belt was likely formed in an Andean-type geological environment, implying it was once parallel to a destructive plate boundary. The belt was first identified in the 1980s and was referred as the "Transscandinavian Granite-Porphyry Belt". The current name was first applied in 1987.

== Extent ==
The Transscandinavian Igneous Belt occurs as a ca. 1400 km long belt running from Lofoten in the north to Blekinge in the south. The northern parts of the belt are partly covered by Caledonian nappes but crop out in windows (e.g. Rombak, Nasafjället). In addition to this some Caledonian nappes are made up of Transscandinavian Igneous Belt rocks. Beneath the East European Platform the belt continues across the Baltic Sea to northeast Poland and Kaliningrad Oblast.

== Chronology ==
The plutons of the belt formed variously between 1810 and 1650 million years ago (Mya) the oldest rocks overlapping in age with the rocks of the Svecofennian orogeny and the youngest overlapping in age with the deformation and metamorphism of the Gothian orogeny. Three separate periods of igneous activity are recognised in the Transscandinavian Igneous Belt; TIB 1 (1813–1766 Mya), TIB 2 (1723–1691 Mya) and TIB 3 (1681–1657 Mya). This grouping is not perfect as it excludes the youngest units formed 1450 million years ago.

Hundreds of millions of years after the Transscandinavian Igneous Belt was formed it was subject to the particular deformation, tectonics and metamorphism of the Sveconorwegian orogeny about 1100 to 990 million years ago.

== Lithology, petrology and geochemistry ==
Characteristically the granites and similar rocks of the Transscandinavian Igneous Belt are rich in alkali elements (e.g. sodium and potassium) and have porphyritic textures. Not all rocks of the Transcandinavian Igneous Belt have a pure alkaline character, some display chemistries tending to the calc-alkaline magma series. In addition to the above-mentioned rocks lesser amounts of mafic intrusives are also part of the belt.
