= Sveconorwegian orogeny =

Orogenic belt in southwestern Sweden and southern Norway

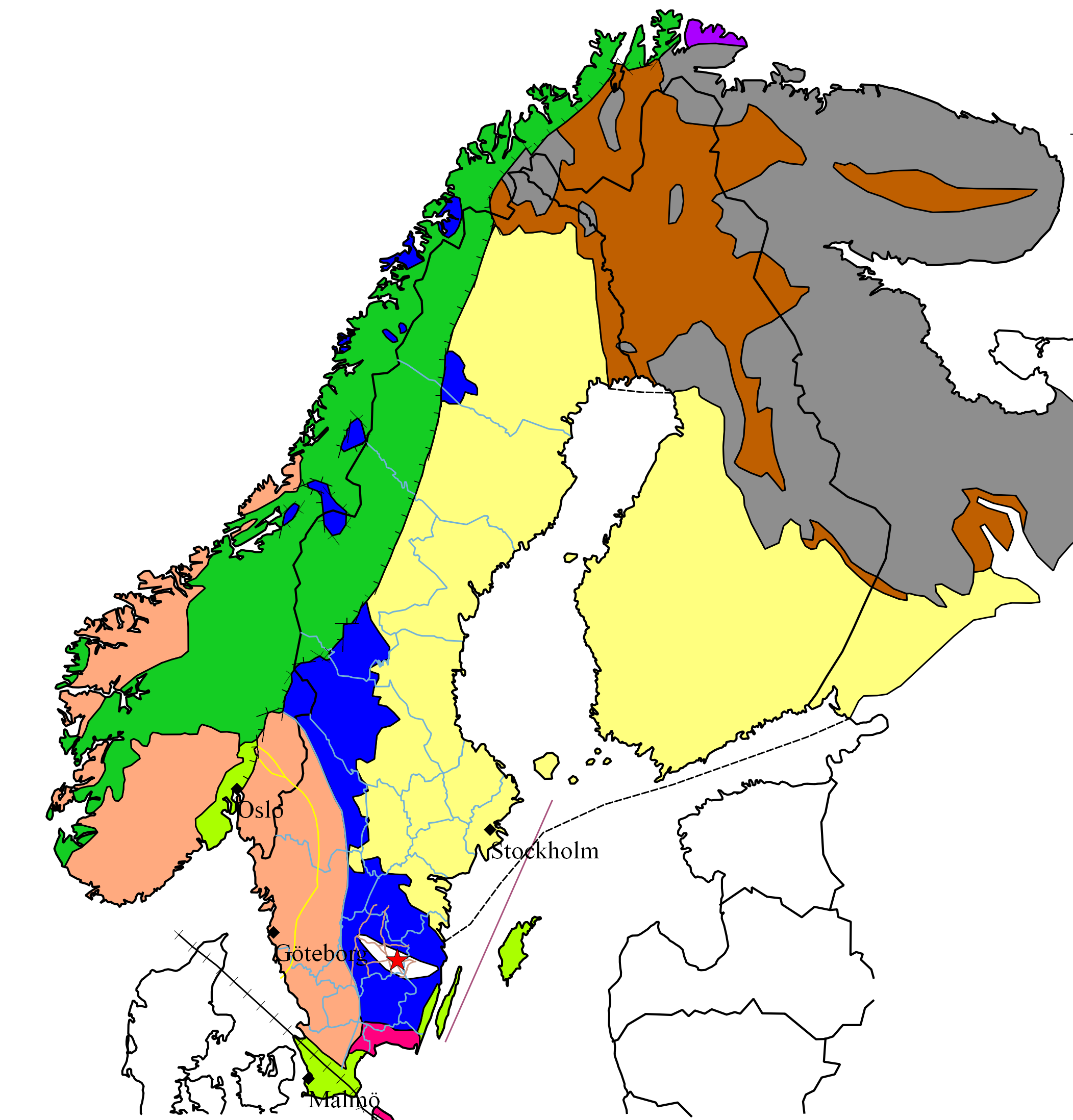
Geological map of Fennoscandia. Archean rocks of the Karelia, Belomorian and Kola domains Proterozoic rocks of the Karelia and Kola domains Svecofennian Domain Transscandinavian Igneous Belt Timanide Orogen Sveconorwegian Orogen inc. the Western Gneiss Region Caledonian nappes

The Sveconorwegian orogeny was an orogenic system active 1140 to 960 million years ago and currently exposed as the Sveconorwegian orogenic belt in southwestern Sweden and southern Norway. In Norway the orogenic belt is exposed southeast of the front of the Caledonian nappe system and in nappe windows. The Sveconorwegian orogen is commonly grouped within the Grenvillian Mesoproterozoic orogens. Contrary to many other known orogenic belts the Sveconorwegian orogens eastern border does not have any known suture zone with ophiolites.

== Tectonic segments ==
The Sveconorwegian orogen orogenic belt is composed of five segments largely made up of gneiss that were disrupted by both extension and compression in the timespan between 1140 and 980 million years ago. From west to east the segments are the terranes of Telemarkia, Bamble, Kongsberg and Idefjorden plus the Eastern Segment. The segments are separated from each other by large-scale shear zones.

- Bamble Terrane: The Bamble Terrane lies together with Kongsberg Terrane as a small sliver between the larger Idefjorden and Telemarkia terranes. The terrane displays amphibolite to granulite facies metamorphism.
- Idefjorden Terrane: The Idefjorden Terrane originated from magmatic activity 1660 to 1520 million years ago and is composed of volcanic, plutonic and metasedimentary rocks. This metamorphism, magmatism and accretion prior to the terranes' participation in the Sveconorwegian orogeny is known as the Gothian event. Between 1050 and 980 million years ago the involvement of the Idefjorden Terrane in the Sveconorwegian orogeny made its rocks reach greenschist to amphibolites facies metamorphism, and even granulite facies in a few localities. To the east the terrane, along with the Eastern Segment, terminates along a shear zone containing mylonite. The Mylonite Zone, as this shear zone is known, runs as an arc from the Oslo graben to northern Halland passing by Lake Vänern. The status of Idefjorden Terrane as a true terrane is disputed.
- Kongsberg Terrane: The Kongsberg Terrane displays amphibolite to granulite facies metamorphism. It is positioned as a small wedge between the larger Idefjorden and Telemarkia terranes.
- Telemarkia Terrane: The Telemarkia Terrane formed about 1520 to 1480 million years ago by a brief period of magmatism and is highly heterogeneous in its rock composition. The western part of the terrane hosts the Sirdal Magmatic Belt which is made up of granitoids including orthogneiss. The igneous rocks of the Sirdal Magmatic Belt are of calc-alkaline character which implies they are related to an ancient subduction system. It is not known if the Telemarkia Terrane originated from a transposed block of Fennoscandian crust or if it derives from another "exotic" craton, possibly Amazonia.
- Eastern Segment: In difference to the other segments that are allochthonous terranes the Eastern Segment is made up of local reworked continental crust of the Transscandinavian Igneous Belt. In other words, it has not been transported across from afar by plate tectonics. There is likely also reworked crust of the much older Svecofennian orogeny in the Eastern Segment. Rocks in the Eastern Segment reached extremely high pressures and temperatures during the Sveconorwegian orogeny resulting in eclogite and granulite facies metamorphism. Eclogites found in the Eastern Segment were at 35–40 kilometres (22–25 mi) depth during the orogeny-caused metamorphism that turned their protoliths into eclogite. The boundary of the Eastern Segment and the Sveconorwegian orogen with Svecofennian and Transcandinavian rocks of Fennoscandia consist of the Sveconorwegian Frontal Deformation Zone and the Protogine Zone.

== Development ==
The period between 1050 and 980 million years ago was the Sveconorwegian orogeny's most active phase with the Telemarkia and Idefjord Terranes being subject to metamorphism, thickening of their crust and deformation. This episode, known as the Agder phase, was followed by the Falkenberg phase that lasted until 970 million years ago during which the orogeny propagated eastward. There are differing views on the nature of the orogeny. One view, known as the "classical", postulates that a continent–continent collision, possibly with Amazonia, was responsible for giving the orogenic belts its current characteristics. An alternative view postulated in 2013 claims such collision did likely not occur as the characteristics of the orogen would be explained solely as the result of subduction and accretion of smaller terranes. These different views have implications for the configuration of the ancient supercontinent Rodinia.

The southern part of what would eventually become the Western Gneiss Region of Norway formed migmatites and was intruded by granites during the orogeny. About 920 million years ago, in the aftermath of the orogeny, Bohus granite intruded the Idefjorden terrane.
