= Gothian orogeny =

Orogeny in western Fennoscandia

The Gothian orogeny (Swedish: Gotiska orogenesen) or Kongsberg orogeny was an orogeny in western Fennoscandia that occurred between 1750 and 1500 million years ago. It precedes the younger Sveconorwegian orogeny that has overprinted much of it. The Gothian orogeny formed along a subduction zone and resulted in the formation of calc-alkaline igneous rocks 1700 to 1550 million years ago, including some of the younger members of the Transscandinavian Igneous Belt.

The deformation associated with the orogeny can be seen in metatonalite, paragneiss and biotite orthogneisses in southeast Norway. These rocks were all subject to amphibolite facies metamorphism.
