= Lapland Granulite Belt =

Geology of Norway, Finland and Russia

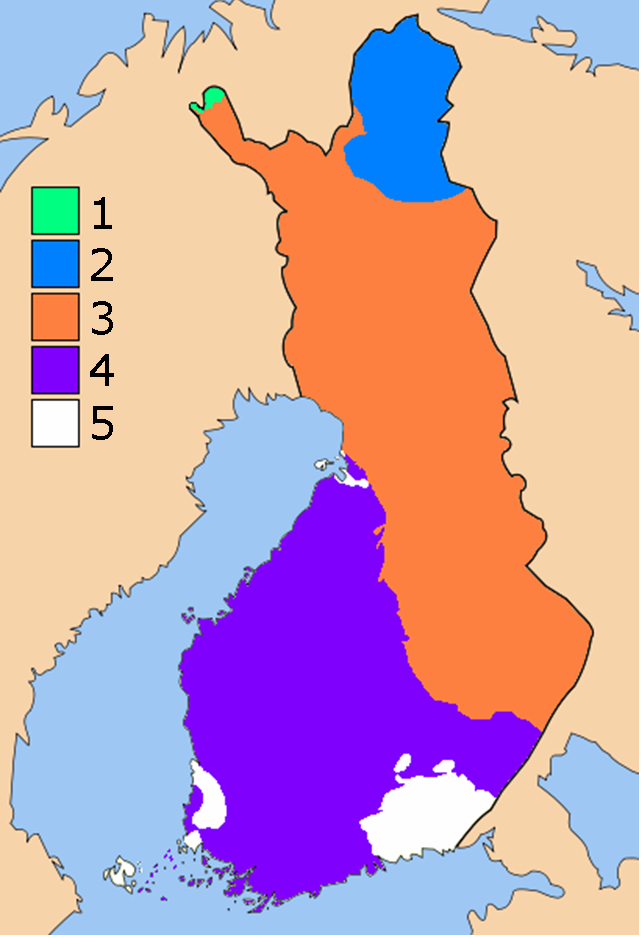
Map showing the large-scale geological units of Finland. The Lapland Granulite Belt and the Inari complex (2) are shown in blue. The Older Karelian Domain (3) is orange coloured.

The Lapland Granulite Belt is an elongate and arcuate zone of granulite rock in the Cap of the North spanning areas within Norway, Finland and Murmansk Oblast in Russia. At most the belt is 80 km broad. The main rocks of the belt are migmatized greywacke and argillites. Studies of detrital zircon show that the sedimentary protolith of the metamorphic rocks of the belt could not be older than 2900–1940 million years. The belt has norite and enderbite intrusions of calc-alkaline chemistry.

It is believed that the belt formed by the closure of an ancient Lapland-Kola Ocean and the continental collision of two continents of Archean age.

The granulite belt with its arcuate shape is part of the larger Inari orocline. This orocline include also the Tana and Karasjok belts. Two ideas on origin of the orocline have been proposed; that it originated at the same time as the southwest directed thrusting of the Lapland Granulite Belt or that it former by lateral compression after the thrusting event.
