= Scandinavian Caledonides =

Remains of an orogenic belt formed during the Silurian–Devonian period

Location of the different branches of the Caledonian/Acadian belts at the end of the Caledonian orogeny (Early Devonian). Present day coastlines are indicated in gray for reference. Note, that the North-German–Polish Caledonides were not formed during the Scandian orogeny but during the "soft docking" of East Avalonia to Baltica at about 443 Ma. The Acadian orogeny resulted from the prolonged collision of the "peri-Gondwanan terranes" with the Laurentian autochthon. Later in geological history, the North Atlantic Ocean opened and the different parts of the orogenic belt moved apart. See also Iapetus Suture and Trans-European Suture Zone.

The Scandinavian Caledonides are the vestiges of an ancient, today deeply eroded orogenic belt formed during the Silurian–Devonian continental collision of Baltica and Laurentia, which is referred to as the Scandian phase of the Caledonian orogeny. The size of the Scandinavian Caledonides at the time of their formation can be compared with the size of the Himalayas. The area east of the Scandinavian Caledonides, including parts of Finland, developed into a foreland basin where old rocks and surfaces were covered by sediments. Today, the Scandinavian Caledonides underlie most of the western and northern Scandinavian Peninsula, whereas other parts of the Caledonides can be traced into West and Central Europe as well as parts of Greenland and eastern North America.

== Plate-tectonic history ==
The Caledonian Wilson cycle commenced with the continental break-up of Rodinia and the opening of the Iapetus Ocean about 616–583 Ma (mega-annum) ago. The Iapetus was at its widest in the Late Cambrian–Early Ordovician before it began to close by subduction of Iapetus oceanic crust along the Gondawanan and Laurentian margins starting between 500 and 488 Ma ago. Subduction of Iapetus crust continued until about 430 Ma ago until the final continental collision of Laurentia with Baltica, i.e. the Scandian phase of the Caledonian orogeny. The time of the continental collision is estimated by the cessation of subduction-related magmatism and a common apparent polar wander path (APWP) for Laurentia and Baltica.

During the collision, the Baltican continental margin was deeply subducted beneath Laurentia and eclogitized. The time of the maximal burial of the Baltican margin is estimated at 410 Ma ago by radiometric age dating of the ultra-high pressure (UHP) metamorphism in the Western Gneiss Region (WGR). Also during the collision, the Caledonian allochthons were thrust over the Baltican margin. Peak metamorphism in the allochthons is estimated to have occurred somewhat earlier than in the autochthon at about 420 Ma ago.

Following the subduction of the Baltican continental margin and thrusting of the nappes over the Baltican basement, the orogen began to collapse in the Early Devonian, which was associated with extensional tectonics and sinistral motion between the Laurentian and Baltican tectonic plates.

== Disposition of rocks ==
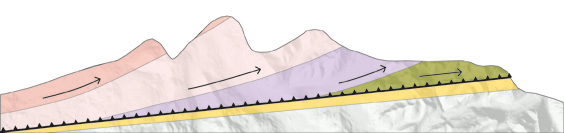
A conceptual NW-SE oriented cross section of the Scandinavian Caledonides near Torneträsk in northernmost Sweden. Each nappe is shown with a different colour. Arrows show the relative movement of each nappe. The décollement plane is shown as black dented line. Note the general movement towards the southeast.

The Caledonian orogeny put in place most of the bedrock now seen in the Scandinavian Mountains. Caledonian rocks overlie rocks of the much older Svecokarelian and Sveconorwegian provinces. The Caledonian rocks form large nappes (Swedish: skollor) that have been thrust over the older rocks. Much of the Caledonian rocks have been eroded since they were put in place meaning that they were once thicker and more contiguous. It is also implied from the erosion that the nappes of Caledonian rock originally reached further east than they do today. The erosion has left remaining massifs of Caledonian rocks and windows of Precambrian-aged rock.

While there are some disagreements, geologists generally recognize four units among the nappes: an Uppermost, an Upper, a Middle and a Lower one. (Note: Corfu and coworkers assess the scheme as a "useful basis for further exploration" but regard it also as "too rigid and simplistic" since paleogeography is poorly represented.) The last one is made up Ediacaran (Vendian), Cambrian, Ordovician and Silurian-aged sedimentary rocks. Pieces of Precambrian shield rocks are in some places also incorporated into the Lower nappes.

== Present-day topography of Scandinavia ==
Despite occurring in roughly the same area, the ancient Scandinavian Caledonian Mountains and the modern Scandinavian Mountains are not synonymous. The overlap between the Scandinavian Caledonides and the Scandinavian Mountains has led to various suggestions that the modern Scandinavian Mountains are a remnant of the Caledonide mountains. A version of this argument was put forward in 2009 with the claim that the uplift of the mountains was attained by buoyancy of the surviving "mountain roots" of the Caledonian orogen. This concept has been criticized because there is only a tiny "mountain root" beneath the southern Scandinavian Mountains and no "root" at all in the north. Further, the Caledonian Mountains in Scandinavia are known to have undergone orogenic collapse for a long period starting in the Devonian. Another problem with this model is that it does not explain why other former mountains dating back to the Caledonian orogeny are eroded and buried in sediments and not uplifted by their "roots". Others claim that molten magma exists below the Caledonides of Norway, causing the uplift.

== See also ==
- Caledonian rocks of northern Finland
- Origin of the Scandinavian Mountains
- Timanide Orogen
- Weichselian glaciation
