= Collage (geology) =

In geology a collage is a tectonostratigraphic unit characterized by its heterogeneity in terms of its lithology, rock ages, or both. The term is usually applied to Precambrian tectonostratigraphic units. Collages form by plate tectonic processes like accretion and continental collision. The sutures of the former Tethys Ocean is found around a large collage.
