= Svecofennian orogeny =

Geological processes in Sweden, Finland, and Russia

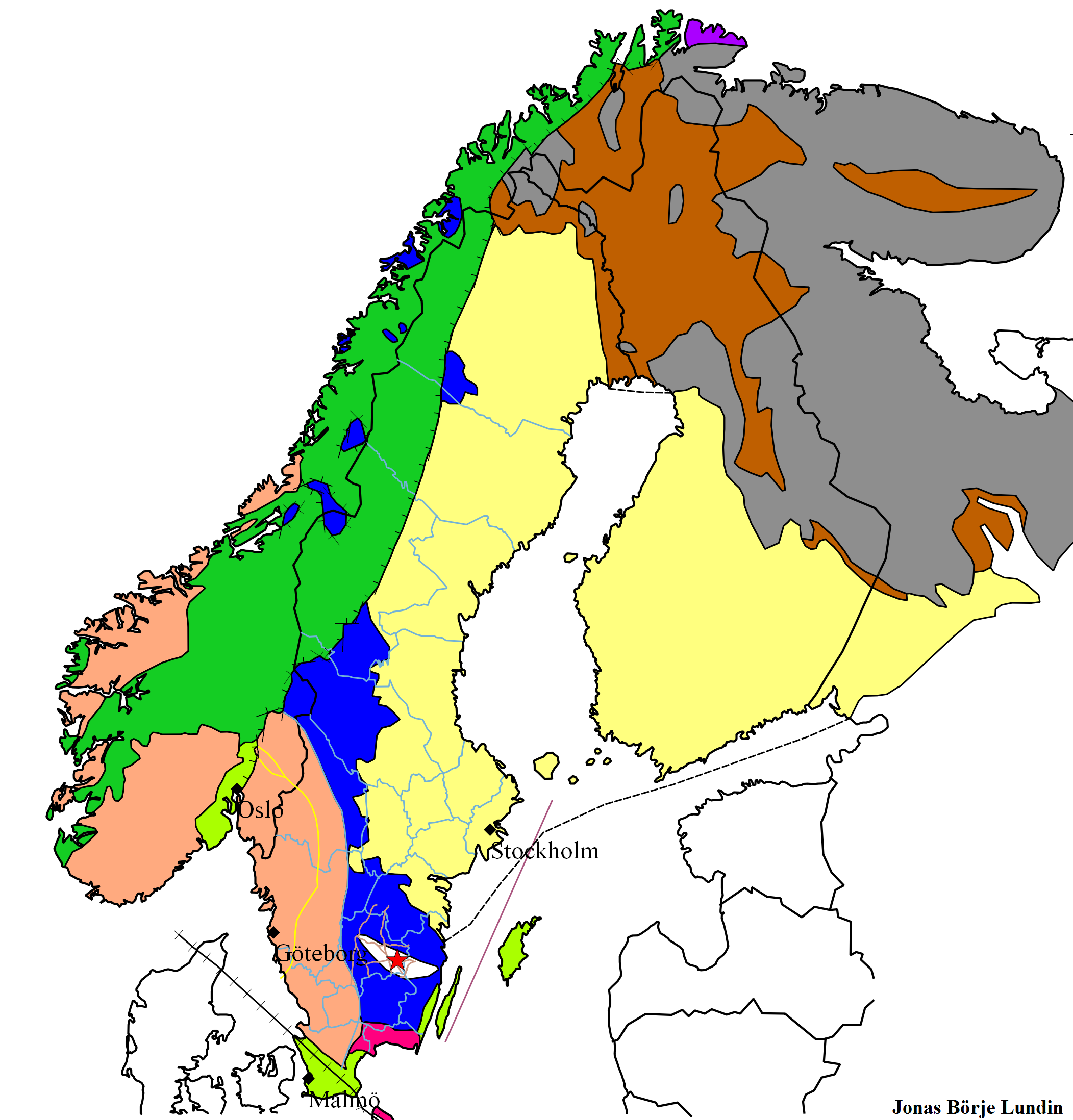
Geological map of Fennoscandia: the Svecofennian orogen is shown in yellow. The blue areas to the west are the Transscandinavian Igneous Belt. The nappes emplaced by the much younger Caledonian orogeny are shown in light green.

The Svecofennian orogeny (Note: Svecokarelian orogeny is the name of an alternative and slightly different orogeny conceptualization that overlaps with the Svecofennian orogeny. As of 2004 there was no consensus on the usage of the terms. Some geologists prefer the term Svecofennian orogeny rather than Svecokarelian orogeny because evidence of orogenic movements is found mostly in the younger Svecofennian bedrock.) is a series of related orogenies that resulted in the formation of much of the continental crust in what is today Sweden and Finland along with minor parts of Russia, mainly within what is today the Republic of Karelia. The orogenies lasted from about 2000 to 1800 million years ago during the Paleoproterozoic Era. The resulting orogen is known as the Svecofennian orogen or Svecofennides. To the west and southwest the Svecofennian orogen limits with the generally younger Transscandinavian Igneous Belt. It is assumed that the westernmost fringes of the Svecofennian orogen have been reworked by the Sveconorwegian orogeny just as the western parts of the Transscandinavian Igneous Belt has. The Svecofennian orogeny involved the accretion of numerous island arcs in such manner that the pre-existing craton grew with this new material from what is today northeast to the southwest. The accretion of the island arcs was also related to two other processes that occurred in the same period; the formation of magma that then cooled to form igneous rocks and the metamorphism of rocks.

== Development of the orogeny ==
The Svecofennian orogeny developed as a succession of four orogenies which by chronological order are: the Lapland-Savo orogeny, the Fennian orogeny, the Svecobaltic orogeny and the Nordic orogeny. In broad terms, regardless of details, it has been proposed that the Svecofennian orogeny involved more-less continuous subduction with subduction zones progressively migrating to the southwest. An alternative model postulates subduction included alternating extension and compression cycles, with the orogenic activity ceasing after the collision between the Fennoscandian Craton and the Sarmatian Craton.

=== Lapland-Savo orogeny ===
Prior to the onset of orogeny the Archean-aged craton of what is today northeastern Fennoscandia rifted creating an ocean basin, the "pre-Svecofennian Ocean", that then closed during the Svecofennian orogeny. The closure of this basin was indebted to subduction and resulted thus both in the formation of igneous rocks and the emplacement of the Jormua and Outokumpu ophiolites about 1950 million years ago. In the later stages of the Lapland-Savo orogeny an island arc, the Knaften arc, accreted to the Keitele-Karelia-Norrbotten collage.

=== Fennian orogeny ===
The stage to the Fennian orogeny was set by a collision between Keitele and Karelia about 1920–1910 million years ago which resulted in a reorganization of the local plate tectonics. As a consequence the Bergslagen microcontinents collided with the Keitele–Karelia collage starting the Fennian orogeny. The until then linear Fennian orogen was "buckled" from 1870 million years ago onwards due to an orthogonal change in tectonic compressive stress. This resulted in various oroclines around the Gulf of Bothnia.

=== Svecobaltic orogeny ===
Prior to the Svecobaltic orogeny proper there was period of northward-directed subduction at what is now south-central Sweden and southern Finland. The subduction lasted from 1860 to 1840 million years ago and was accompanied by magmatic activity. Two trends in the southern Svecofennian orogen variously overlapped in time and space: extension (1870 to 1840 million years ago) and continent-continent collision (1870 to 1790 million years ago). Magmatic activity and metamorphism in southern Finland ended gradually after 1870 million years ago. The orogen at southern Finland with its presumed mountains and thick continental crust collapsed under the influence of gravity and spread out. By 1850 million years ago this collapse had evolved to a dynamic of extensional tectonics. In this extensional milieu short-lived sedimentary basins formed. The Svecobaltic orogeny developed when subduction bought the Fennoscandian Craton into an oblique collision with the Sarmatian Craton. The mentioned sedimentary basins were destroyed by basin inversion 1830 million years ago. This last event of basin inversion was associated with a period of metamorphism in southern Finland that peaked about 1820 million years ago.

=== Nordic orogeny and later development ===
Two models exist regarding the origin of the Nordic orogeny: one proposes it as an Andean-type orogeny with subduction but no accretion or continental collision and the other poses it might have resulted from the collision of the Fennoscandian Craton with the Amazonia continent.

The Svecofennian orogen underwent a gravitational collapse from 1790 to 1770 million years ago. The late magmatism following the orogeny overlaps in time with the early magmatism of the Transscandinavian Igneous Belt. This magmatism was largely the result of anatexis forming migmatites and large plutons. Another characteristic of the late magmatism is the apparent lack of mafic and intermediate compositions among the magmas, which are nearly all felsic.

== Features of the orogen ==
=== Tectonostratigraphic units ===
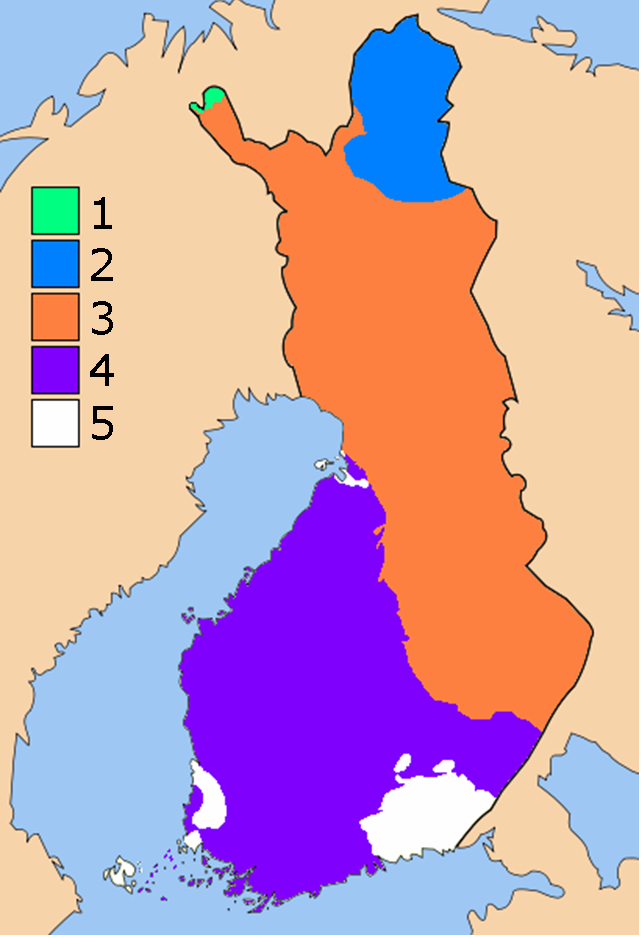
Map showing the large-scale geological units of Finland. The Svecofennian orogen (4) is shown in violet blue. The Older Karelian Domain (3) is orange coloured. Areas younger than the Svecofennian orogen are in white.

Geologist Baltybaev (2013) have identified the following terranes as composing the Svecofennian orogen (parenthesis indicate location): Skellefteå Terrane (Skellefte River Basin), Bothnian Terrane (Västernorrland and Ostrobothnia), Pyhäsalmi Terrane (Northern Savonia), Central Terrane (Central Finland), Western Terrane (Gävleborg), Ladoga Terrane (southern Finland–Russia border) and the Southern Terrane (Bergslagen and Southern Finland).

Baltybaev further distinguishes between an outer zone in the northeast and an inner zone in the southwest. The inner zone is characterized by I-type calc-alkaline granitoids. In contrast the outer zone contains more S-type granitoids. There are differences between the metamorphosed sediments found in the two zones while the outer zone contains metagreywackes the inner zone hosts metapelites. Rocks of the outer zone are estimated to have formed 1890–1860 million years ago and granitoids of the inner zone 1840–1790 million years ago. In addition to those two zones Baltybaev identifies a narrow zone of conjugation with Archean complexes between the outer zone and the Archean craton to the north and east. Nironen and Mänttäri (2012) uses the terms Central Svecofennian terrane and Southern Svecofennian terrane for approximately the same areas Baltybaev calls outer and inner zone respectively.

The Oskarshamn-Jönköping belt is a granitoid region of the Svecofennian orogen completely surrounded by rocks of Transscandinavian Igneous Belt. As the name implies the Oskarshamn-Jönköping belt runs as sliver from the vicinity of Oskarshamn northwest to the Jönköping area. It has been proposed that the Oskarshamn-Jönköping belt continues beneath the East European Platform in Lithuania.

=== Major faults and sutures ===
The boundary of the Svecofennian orogen with the Archean "Kola-Karelian orogen" to the northwest is made up by the Luleå-Kuopio suture zone.

The dextral South Finland Shear Zone runs across much of southern Finland in a west–east direction.
