= Western Gneiss region =

Large geological unit in Norway, part of the Baltic shield

The Western Gneiss region (Norwegian: Gneisregionen) is a large geological unit in Norway chiefly made of gneiss rock that formed through metamorphism during the Caledonian orogeny. It makes up a tectono-stratigraphic terrane of the Scandinavian Caledonides and is also part of the Baltic shield. The region extends across western Norway from Bergen to Trondheim as a Caledonian window, outliers of the Western Gneiss region crop out as far north as the Lofoten archipelago. The rocks of the Western Gneiss region are made up of variously deformed Precambrian basement, and cover rocks of autochthonous and para-autochthonous origin with evidence of medium to high grade metamorphism including ultra-high-pressure metamorphism.

Rocks of the Western Gneiss region formed 1.7 to 1.6 Billion years ago in the Late Paleoproterozoic. What was to become the Western Gneiss region was intruded by migmatites and granites during the Sveconorwegian orogeny.
