= Timanide Orogen =

Orogen that formed during the Neoproterozoic

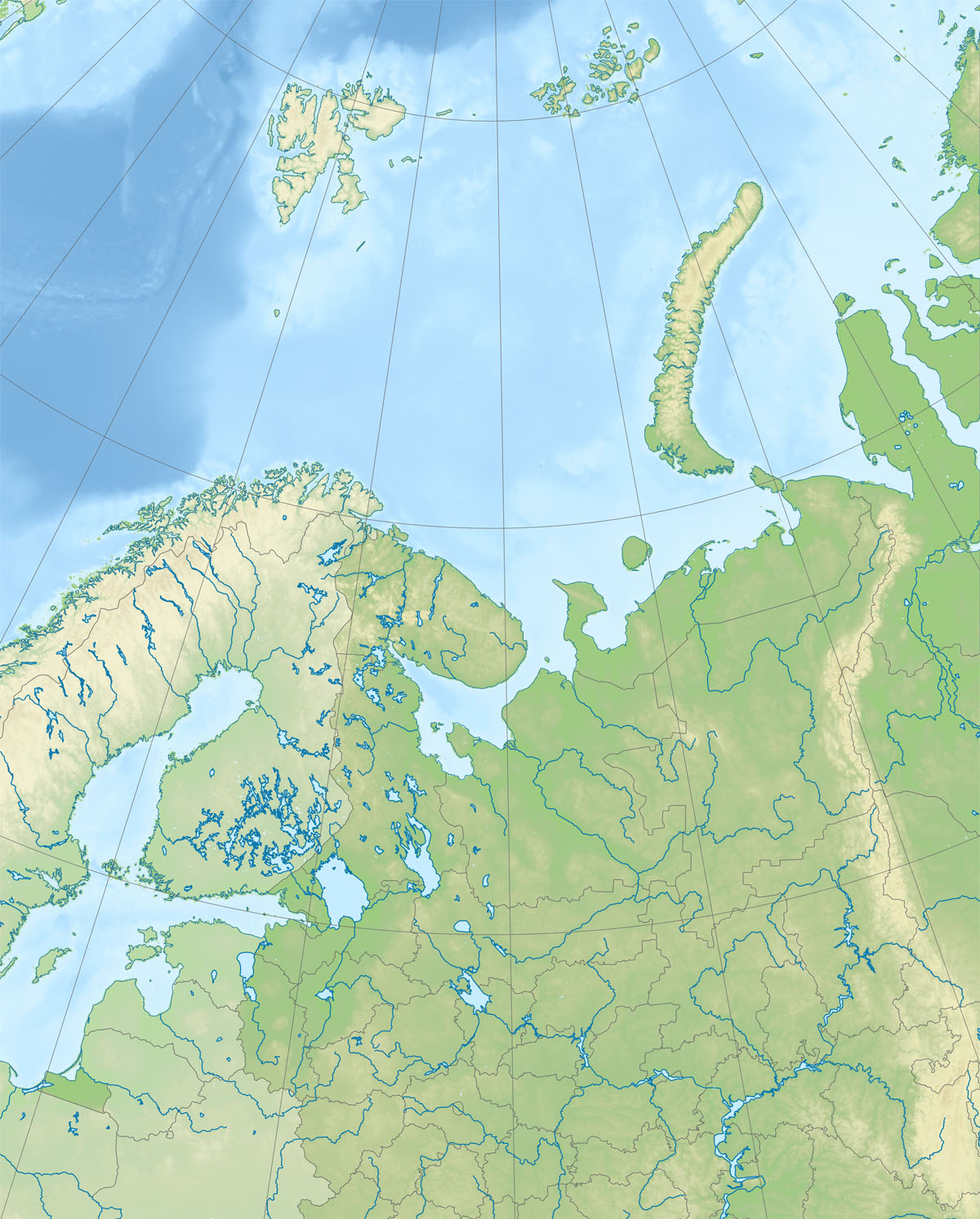
Selection of outcrops of the Timanide Orogen.

The Timanide Orogen (Russian: Ороген Протоуралид-Тиманид, literally: "Protouralian–Timanide Orogen") is a pre-Uralian orogen that formed in northeastern (Note: All coordinates in this article are in relation to present-day geography and not to the past disposition of continents, terranes and oceans.) Baltica during the Neoproterozoic in the Timanide orogeny. (Note: Another name for the orogen is "Baikalides" which is a name that has been used in wider sense to refer chiefly to orogens south of the Siberian Craton. Among Russian scientists the term "Baikalian", coined in 1935 by Schatsky, was for long time the most common term for the orogen until the 1990s.) The orogen is about 3000 km long. Its extreme points include the southern Urals in the south and the Polar Urals, the Kanin and Varanger peninsulas in the north. The Timan Ridge is the type area of the orogen. To the west, at the Varanger Peninsula, the north-west oriented Timanide Orogen is truncated by the younger Scandinavian Caledonide Orogen that has an oblique disposition. The northeastern parts of the orogen are made up of volcanic and sedimentary rocks, granitoids and few ophiolites. In contrast the southwestern part of the orogen is made up mostly of sedimentary rocks. I and A type granitoids and volcanic rocks are common in the orogen.

From the Late Neoproterozoic to the Middle Cambrian the Timanide Orogen was associated to a subduction zone that existed to the northeast of it. Most studies interpret subduction as going inward (subducted plate moving southwest) albeit one suggest the opposite (subducted plate moving to the northeast). In the Cambrian the Timanide Orogen is believed to have developed in a continental collision context as Baltica and Arctida collided between 528 and 510 million years ago. Some researchers do however dissent from this view suggesting there was never such a collision.

Erosion of the Timanide Orogen have produced sediments that are now found in the East European Platform, including the Cambrian Sablino Formation near Lake Ladoga. Studies of sediments points that it is likely that the erosion of the orogen was beginning in the Cambrian and then became stronger in Ordovician.

The first geologists to study the orogen where Wilhelm Ramsay and Feodosy Tschernyschev who published works in 1899 and 1901 respectively. Hans Reusch compiled the existing knowledge on the orogen in 1900.
