= Continental collision =

Formation of mountains from converging tectonic plates

Cartoon of a tectonic collision between two continents

In geology, continental collision is a phenomenon of plate tectonics that occurs at convergent boundaries. Continental collision is a variation on the fundamental process of subduction, whereby the subduction zone is destroyed, mountains produced, and two continents sutured together. Continental collision is only known to occur on Earth.

Continental collision is not an instantaneous event, but may take several tens of millions of years before the faulting and folding caused by collisions stop. The collision between India and Asia has been going on for about 50 million years already and shows no signs of abating. Collision between East and West Gondwana to form the East African Orogen took about 100 million years from beginning (610 Ma) to end (510 Ma). The collision between Gondwana and Laurasia to form Pangea occurred in a relatively brief interval, about 50 million years long.

== Subduction zone: the collision site ==
The process begins as two continents (different bits of continental crust), separated across a tract of ocean (and oceanic crust), approach each other, while the oceanic crust is slowly consumed at a subduction zone. The subduction zone runs along the edge of one of the continents and dips under it, raising volcanic mountain chains at some distance behind it, such as the Andes of South America today. Subduction involves the whole lithosphere, the density of which is largely controlled by the nature of the crust it carries. Oceanic crust is thin (~6 km thick) and dense (about 3.3 g/cm^{3}), consisting of basalt, gabbro, and peridotite. Consequently, most oceanic crust is subducted easily at an oceanic trench. In contrast, continental crust is thick (~45 km thick) and buoyant, composed mostly of granitic rocks (average density about 2.5 g/cm^{3}). Continental crust is subducted with difficulty, but it is subducted to depths of 90–150 km or more, as evidenced by ultra-high pressure (UHP) metamorphic suites. Normal subduction continues as long as the ocean exists, but the subduction system is disrupted as the continent carried by the downgoing plate enters the trench. Because it contains thick continental crust, this lithosphere is less dense than the underlying asthenospheric mantle and normal subduction is disrupted. The volcanic arc on the upper plate is slowly extinguished. Resisting subduction, the continental crust buckles up and under, raising mountains where a trench used to be. However, a continental plate with subducted ocean lithosphere attached to it can start to be subducted from the pull the oceanic lithosphere's dense weight. A great example of this can be seen in the Himalayas where the amount of collisional shortening of India and Asia suggests that continental subduction is occurring. The position of the trench becomes a zone that marks the suture between the two continental terranes. Suture zones are often marked by fragments of the pre-existing oceanic crust and mantle rocks, known as ophiolites.

== Deep subduction of continental crust ==
The continental crust on the downgoing plate is deeply subducted as part of the downgoing plate during collision, defined as buoyant crust entering a subduction zone. An unknown proportion of subducted continental crust returns to the surface as ultra-high pressure (UHP) metamorphic terranes, which contain metamorphic coesite and/or diamond plus or minus unusual silicon-rich garnets and/or potassium-bearing pyroxenes. The presence of these minerals demonstrate subduction of continental crust to at least 90–140 km deep. Examples of UHP terranes are known from the Dabie–Sulu belt of east-central China, the Western Alps, the Himalaya of India, the Kokchetav Massif of Kazakhstan, the Bohemian Massif of Europe, the North Qaidam of Northwestern China, the Western Gneiss Region of Norway, and Mali. Most UHP terranes consist of an imbricated sheets or nappes. The fact that most UHP terranes consist of thin sheets suggests that much thicker, volumetrically dominant tracts of continental crust are more deeply subducted.

== Orogeny and collapse ==
Mountain formation by a reverse fault movement

An orogeny is underway when mountains begin to grow in the collision zone. There are other modes of mountain formation and orogeny but certainly continental collision is one of the most important. Rainfall and snowfall increase on the mountains as these rise, perhaps at a rate of a few millimeters per year (at a growth rate of 1 mm/year, a 5,000 m tall mountain can form in 5 million years, a time period that is less than 10% of the life of a typical collision zone). River systems form, and glaciers may grow on the highest peaks. Erosion accelerates as the mountains rise, and great volumes of sediment are shed into the rivers, which carry sediment away from the mountains to be deposited in sedimentary basins in the surrounding lowlands. Crustal rocks are thrust faulted over the sediments and the mountain belt broadens as it rises in height. A crustal root also develops, as required by isostasy; mountains can be high if underlain by thicker crust. Crustal thickening may happen as a result of crustal shortening or when one crust overthrusts the other. Thickening is accompanied by heating, so the crust becomes weaker as it thickens. The lower crust begins to flow and collapse under the growing mountain mass, forming rifts near the crest of the mountain range. The lower crust may partially melt, forming anatectic granites which then rise into the overlying units, forming granite intrusions. Crustal thickening provides one of two negative feedbacks on mountain growth in collision zones, the other being erosion. The popular notion that erosion is responsible for destroying mountains is only half correct – viscous flow of weak lower mantle also reduces relief with time, especially once the collision is complete and the two continents are completely sutured. Convergence between the continents continues because the crust is still being pulled down by oceanic lithosphere sinking in the subduction zone to either side of the collision as well as beneath the impinging continent.

The pace of mountain building associated with the collision is measured by radiometric dating of igneous rocks or units that have been metamorphosed during the collision and by examining the record of sediments shed from the rising mountains into the surrounding basins. The pace of ancient convergence can be determined with paleomagnetic measurements, while the present rate of convergence can be measured with GPS.

== Far-field effects ==
The effects of the collision are felt far beyond the immediate site of collision and mountain-building. As convergence between the two continents continues, the region of crustal thickening and elevation will become broader. If there is an oceanic free face, the adjacent crustal blocks may move towards it. As an example of this, the collision of India with Asia forced large regions of crust to move south to form modern Southeast Asia. Another example is the collision of Arabia with Asia, which is squeezing the Anatolian sub-plate (present day Turkey). As a result, Turkey is moving west and south into the Mediterranean Sea and away from the collision zone. These far-field effects may result in the formation of rifts, and rift valleys such as that occupied by Lake Baikal, the deepest lake on Earth.

== Fossil collision zones ==
Continental collisions are a critical part of the supercontinent cycle and have happened many times in the past. Ancient collision zones are deeply eroded but may still be recognized because these mark sites of intense deformation, metamorphism, and plutonic activity that separate tracts of continental crust having different geologic histories prior to the collision. Old collision zones are commonly called "suture zones" by geologists, because this is where two previous continents are joined or sutured together.
