= Geology of Åland =

The geological makeup of Åland, Finland, includes Jotnian age sediments from the Proterozoic, such as sandstone, siltstone, arkose, conglomerate, rapakivi granite and shale. The islands are underlain by plutonic rocks common of the Svecofennian Domain.

== Geological history ==
=== Precambrian ===
==== Archaean eon ====
The rapakivi granite on Åland was formed during the Archaean around 1640–1540 Mya by anorogenic tectonic settings.

==== Proterozoic eon ====
The Jotnian age sediments were formed during the Proterozoic. Jotnian sediments are usually assigned to the Riphean Stage of the Mesoproterozoic Era. Jotnian sediments were deposited approximately 1600–1260 Mya. Some Jotnian sediments are, however, younger than the diabases, meaning they can be younger than 1260 Mya. Lumparn would be formed during the Proterozoic by a meteorite.

Modern Åland would be part of Baltica, a paleocontinent that formed in the Paleoproterozoic. Baltica formed at c. 2000–1700 Mya by the collision of three Archaean-Proterozoic continental blocks: Fennoscandia (including the exposed Baltic Shield), Sarmatia (Ukrainian Shield and Voronezh Massif), and Volgo-Uralia (covered by younger deposits). Sarmatia and Volgo-Uralia formed a proto-craton at c. 2000 Mya which collided with Fennoscandia c. 1800–1700 Mya. The sutures between these three blocks were reactivated during the Mesoproterozoic and Neoproterozoic.

=== Phanerozoic ===
==== Ordovician ====
Between Pleistocene sediments and crushed rapakivi granite bedrock there is a layer of Ordovician limestones at Lumparn. This makes Lumparn one of the few places in Finland where fossils have been found. Fossils of mainly invertebrates have been found, mainly trilobites, mollusks, and crinoids. Echinoderm, conodont fossils and acritarchs have also been found.

==== Quaternary ====
Around 18,000 BC, during the Weichselian glaciation, a thick cover of ice stretched over Scandinavia, which eventually receded from the islands around 9000 BC. Around 8000 BC the highest peaks of the then submerged archipelago rose from the Baltic Sea. The sea levels would alternate in the Baltic Sea, but a land bridge to Åland never formed.

Due to the post-glacial rebound after the icecaps melted, the area around Åland is still rising several millimeters per year, marginally expanding the archipelago's surface.

== Geological features ==
=== Lumparn ===
An impact structure from the Proterozoic from around 1000 Mya. The remains of the crater are filled with sediments. Between Pleistocene sediments and crushed rapakivi granite bedrock there is a layer of Paleozoic limestones. This makes Lumparn one of the few places in Finland where fossils have been found. Long shatter cones have been discovered in the southwestern part of the bay.

=== Orrdalsklint ===
Orrdalsklint, at 129.1 metres (423.6 ft) above sea level, is the highest point on Åland. Orrdalsklint would be one of the first parts of Åland to rise out of the sea 10,000 years ago.

=== Ängskärsfjärden ===
The Ängskärsfjärden is a fjard of the Archipelago Sea in Brändö, Åland, Finland. The fjard has a circular appearance, formed as a result of a diapir (intrusion of magma into the Earth's crust).
