= Geography of Ukraine =

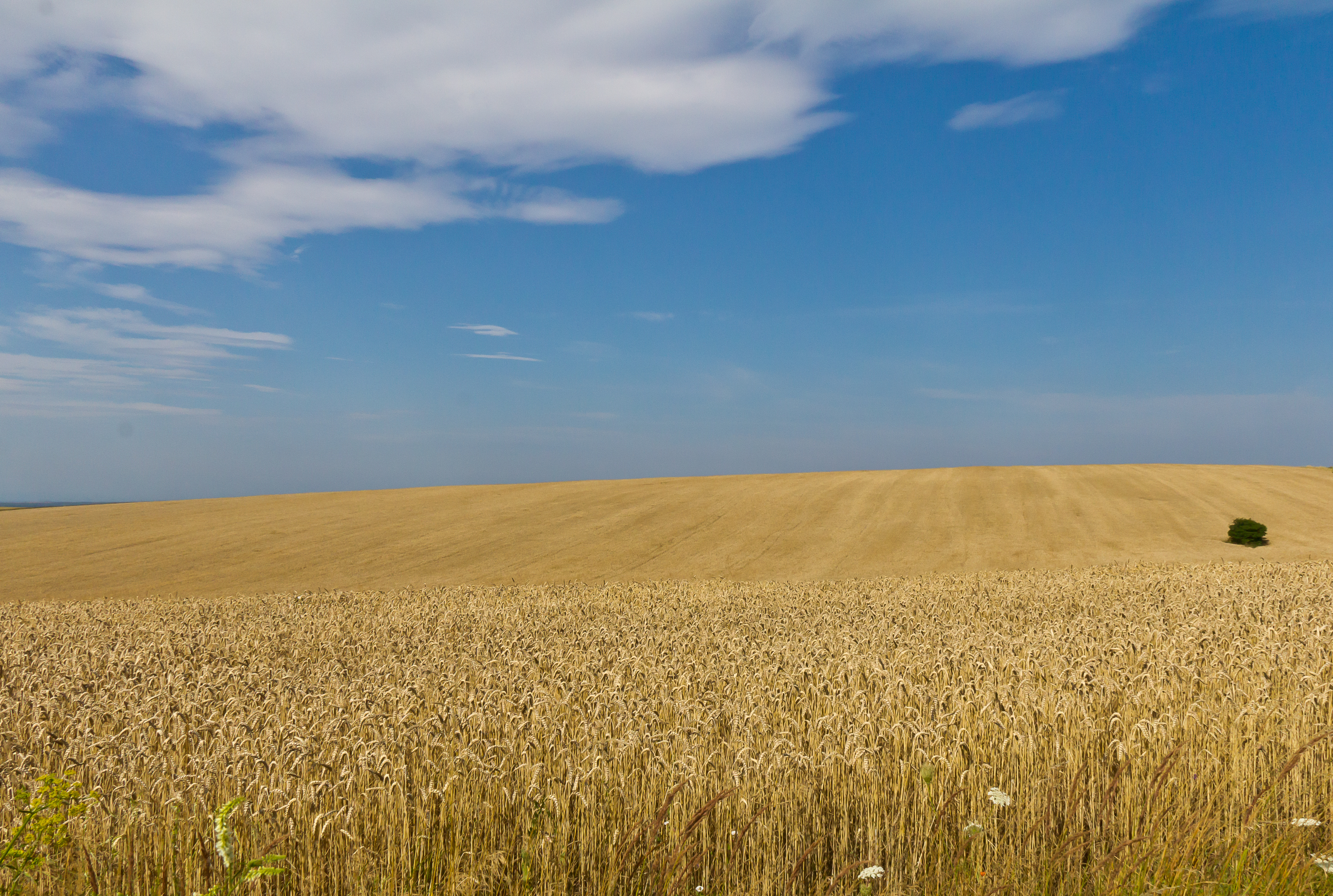
- Wheat field in Ukraine

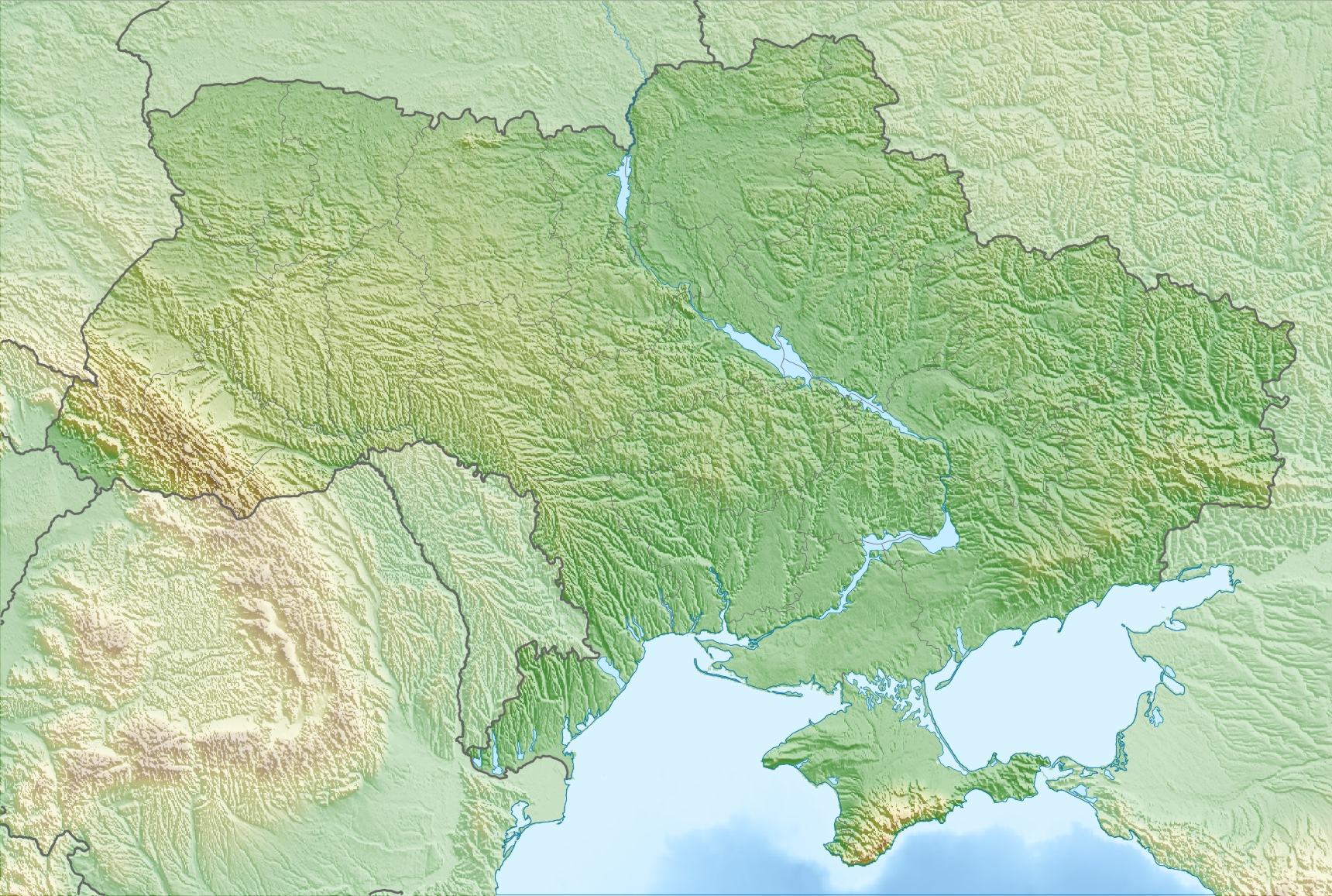
- Continent: Europe
- Region: Eastern Europe
- Coordinates: 50°27′N 30°30′E
- Area: Ranked 45th
  - Total: 603,500 km^{2} (233,000 sq mi)
  - Land: 96%
  - Water: 4%
- Coastline: 2,782 km (1,729 mi)
- Borders: 4,558 km (2,832 mi)
- Highest point: Hoverla; 2,061 metres (6,762 ft)
- Lowest point: Kuyalnik Estuary −5 metres (−16 ft)
- Longest river: Dnieper; 981 kilometres (610 mi) (within Ukraine)
- Largest lake: Lake Yalpuh; 149 km^{2} (57.53 sq mi)
- Exclusive economic zone: 147,318 km^{2} (56,880 mi^{2})

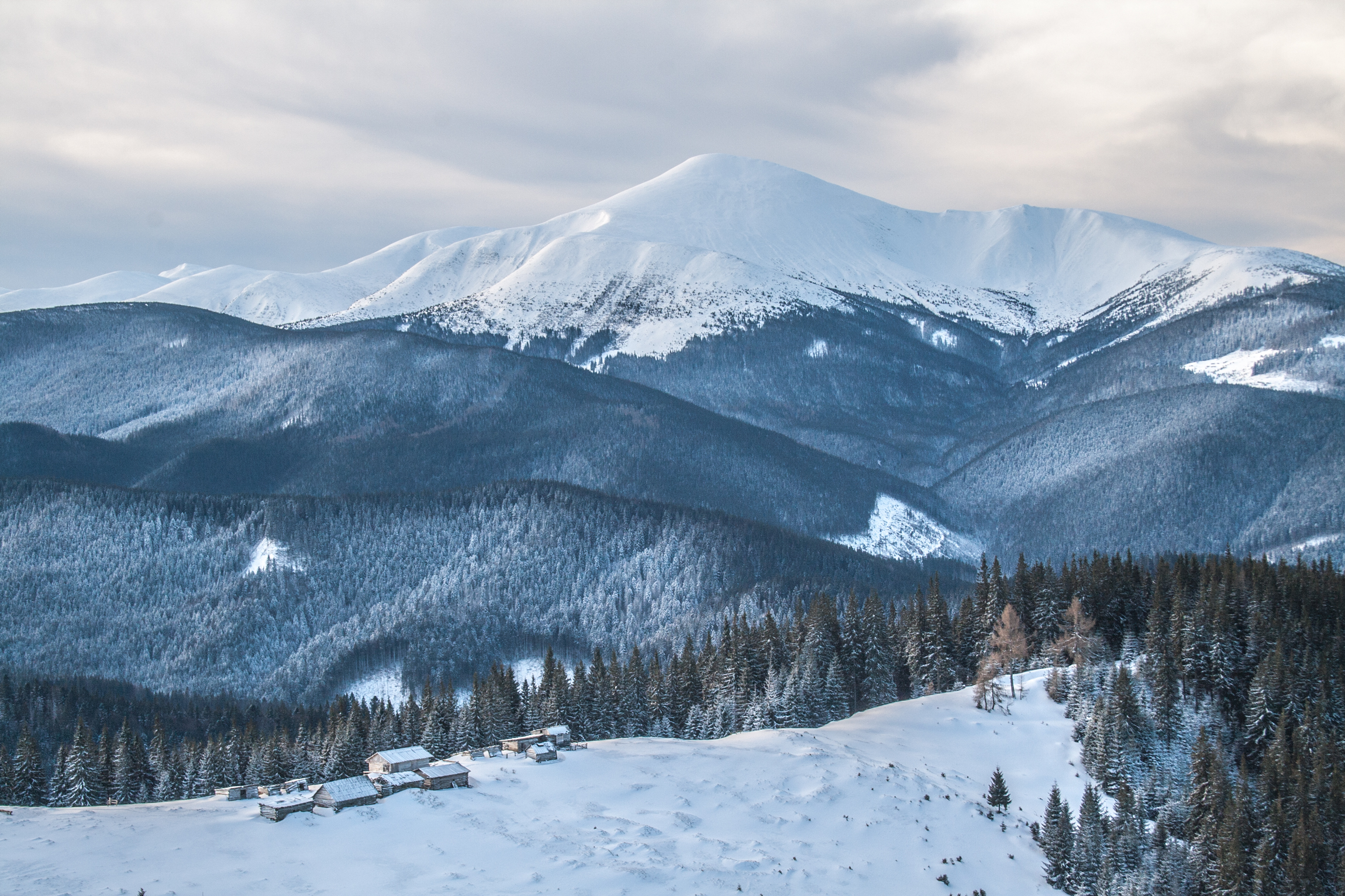
The Carpathian National Park and Hoverla, at 2,061 m (6,762 ft) the highest mountain in Ukraine

Ukraine is the second-largest European country, after Russia. Its various regions have diverse geographic features ranging from highlands to lowlands, as well as climatic range and a wide variety in hydrography. Most of the country lies within the East European Plain.

Lying between latitudes 44° and 53° N, and longitudes 22° and 41° E, Ukraine covers an area of 603,628 square kilometres (233,062 sq mi), with a coastline of 2,782 kilometres (1,729 mi).

The landscape of Ukraine consists mostly of fertile steppes and plateaus, crossed by rivers such as the Dnieper, Siverskyi Donets, Dniester and the Southern Bug as they flow south into the Black Sea and the smaller Sea of Azov. To the southwest, the delta of the Danube forms the border with Romania. The country's only mountains are the Carpathian Mountains in the west, of which the highest is Hoverla at 2,061 metres (6,762 ft), and the Crimean Mountains, in the extreme south along the coast.

Ukraine also has a number of highland regions such as the Volyn-Podillia Upland (in the west) and the Dnieper Upland (on the right bank of the Dnieper). To the east there are the south-western spurs of the Central Russian Upland, over which runs the border with the Russia. Near the Sea of Azov can be found the Donets Ridge and the Azov Upland. The snow melt from the mountains feeds the rivers and their waterfalls.

Significant natural resources in Ukraine include lithium, natural gas, kaolin, timber, and an abundance of arable land. Despite this, the country faces a number of major environmental issues such as inadequate supplies of potable water, air and water pollution, deforestation, and radioactive contamination in the north-east from the 1986 accident at the Chernobyl Nuclear Power Plant.

== Geographic location ==
Map of Ukraine

Ukraine is located in Eastern Europe: lying on the northern shores of the Black Sea and the Sea of Azov. The country borders Belarus in the north, Poland, Slovakia and Hungary in the west, Moldova and Romania in the south-west, and Russia in the east.

The total geographic area of Ukraine is 603,700 square kilometers (233,100 sq mi). Ukraine has an Exclusive Economic Zone of 147,318 km^{2} (56,880 mi^{2}) in the Black Sea.

The land border of Ukraine totals 6,993 kilometers (4,345 mi). The border lengths with each country are: Belarus 891 kilometers (554 mi), Hungary 103 kilometers (64 mi), Moldova 939 kilometers (583 mi), Poland 428 kilometers (266 mi), Romania 169 kilometers (105 mi) on the south and 362 kilometers (225 mi) on the west, Russia 1,974 kilometers (1,227 mi), and Slovakia 90 kilometers (56 mi). Ukraine is also bordered by 3,783 kilometers (2,351 mi) of coastline. The border with Russia, part of which runs through the Sea of Azov, is the country's longest border.

The village of Vel'ké Slemence is split between Slovakia and Ukraine.

== Relief ==
Relief map of Ukraine

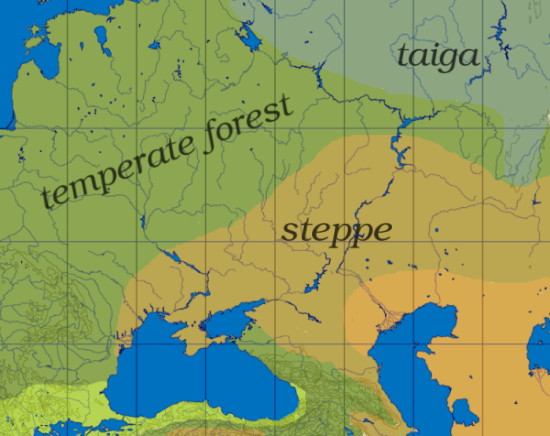
Simplified depiction of the biomes lying north of the Black Sea. The bright green belt girdling the Black Sea's southern coast, extending westwards, denotes a region of subtropics.

Most of its territory lies within the Great European Plain, while parts of western regions and southern regions lay within the Alpine system. In general Ukraine comprises two different biomes: mixed forest towards the middle of the continent, and steppe towards the Black Sea littoral. Major provinces include, Polesian Lowland, Dnieper Lowland, Volhynia-Podolie Plateau, Black Sea-Azov Lowland, Donets-Azov Plateau, Central Russian Upland, Carpathians, and Pannonian Basin.

The western regions feature an alpine-like section of Carpathian Mountains, the Eastern Carpathians that stretches across Poland, Ukraine and Romania. The highest peak is Mount Hoverla, which at 2,061 meters (6,762 ft) above sea level is the highest point in the country. Mountains are limited to the west, the southern tip of Ukraine on the Sea of Azov. The western region has the Carpathian Mountains, and some eroded mountains from the Donets Ridge are in the east near the Sea of Azov.

Most of Ukraine's area is taken up by the steppe-like region just north of the Black Sea. Most of Ukraine consists of fertile plains (or steppes) and plateaus. In terms of land use, 58% of Ukraine is considered arable land; 2% is used for permanent crops, 13% for permanent pastures, 18% is forests and woodland, and 9% is other.

=== Physiographic division of Ukraine ===
Most of Ukraine consists of regular plains with an average height above sea level being 175 metres (574 ft). It is surrounded by mountains to its west and extreme south. Wide spaces of the country's plains are located in the south-western part of the East European Plain. The plains have numerous highlands and lowlands caused by the uneven crystallized base of the East European craton. The highlands are characterized by Precambrian basement rocks from the Ukrainian Shield.

Plains are considered elevations of no more than 0–600 m (0–1,969 ft) among which there are recognized lowlands (plains) and uplands (plateaus, ridges, hill ridges).

==== Great European Plain (subregion East European Plain) ====
- Volhynia-Podillia Upland (Volhynia-Podillia Plateau)
  - Volhynian Upland
  - Podolian Upland
- Little Polesia Plain
- Khotyn Upland (part of Moldavian Plateau)
- Roztochchia
- Sian-Dniester Lowland
- Eastern Carpathian Foothills
- Polesian Lowland
- Dnieper Upland
- Dnieper Lowland
- Central Russian Upland
- Donets-Azov Plateau
  - Donets Upland (Donets Ridge)
  - Azov Upland
- Black Sea-Azov Lowland
  - Black Sea Lowland
  - Crimean Lowland
  - Azov Lowland

==== Alpine system ====
- Transcarpathian Lowland (extension of Great Hungarian Plain, part of Eastern Pannonian Basin)
- Eastern Carpathians (part of Carpathian Mountains)
  - Outer Eastern Carpathians (more Eastern Beskids and the Ukrainian Carpathians)
  - Inner Eastern Carpathians (more Vihorlat-Gutin Area)
- Crimean Mountains

== Soil ==
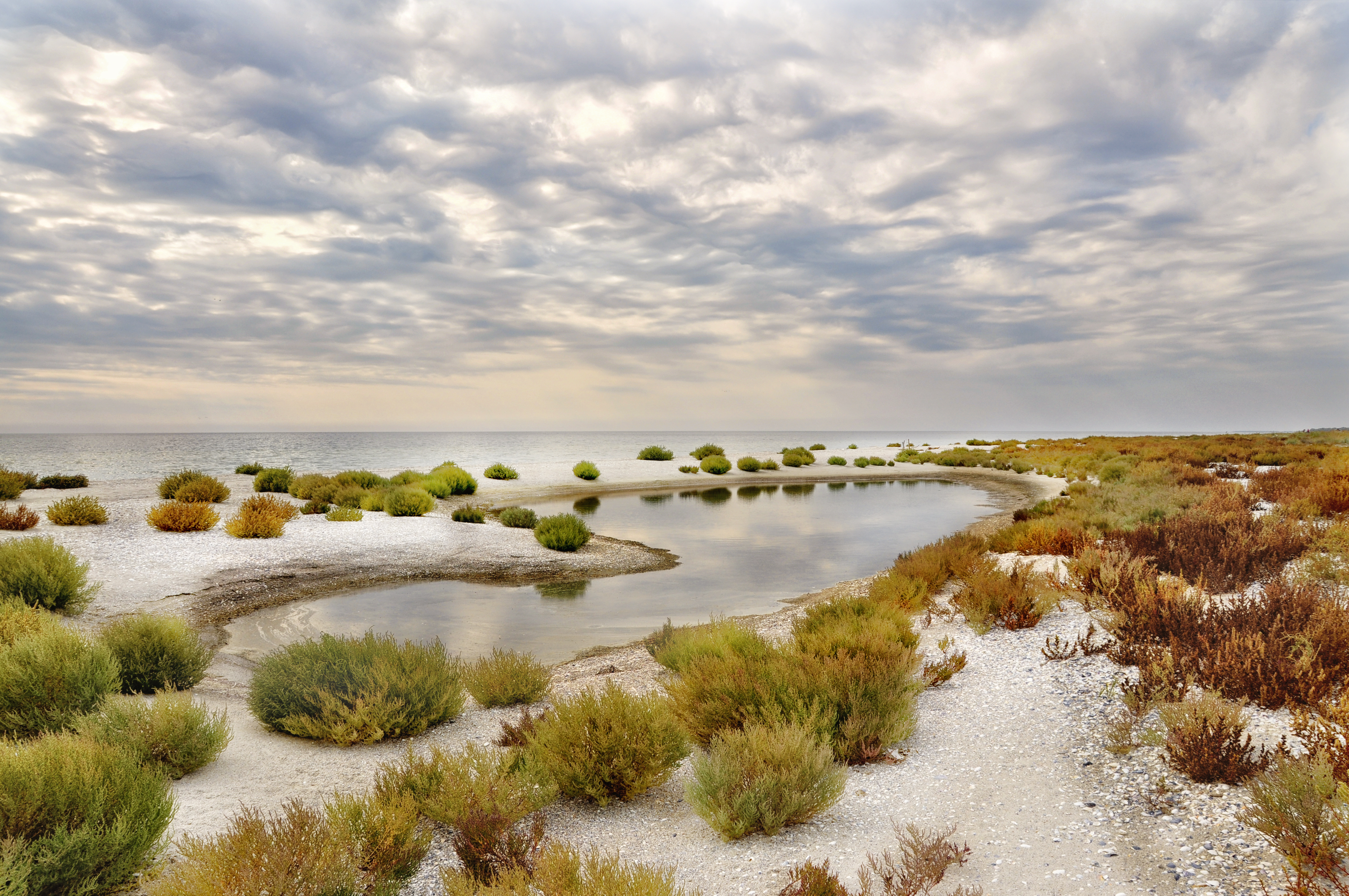
Kinburn sandbar, Ochakiv Raion, Mykolaiv Oblast

From northwest to southeast the soils of Ukraine may be divided into three major aggregations:

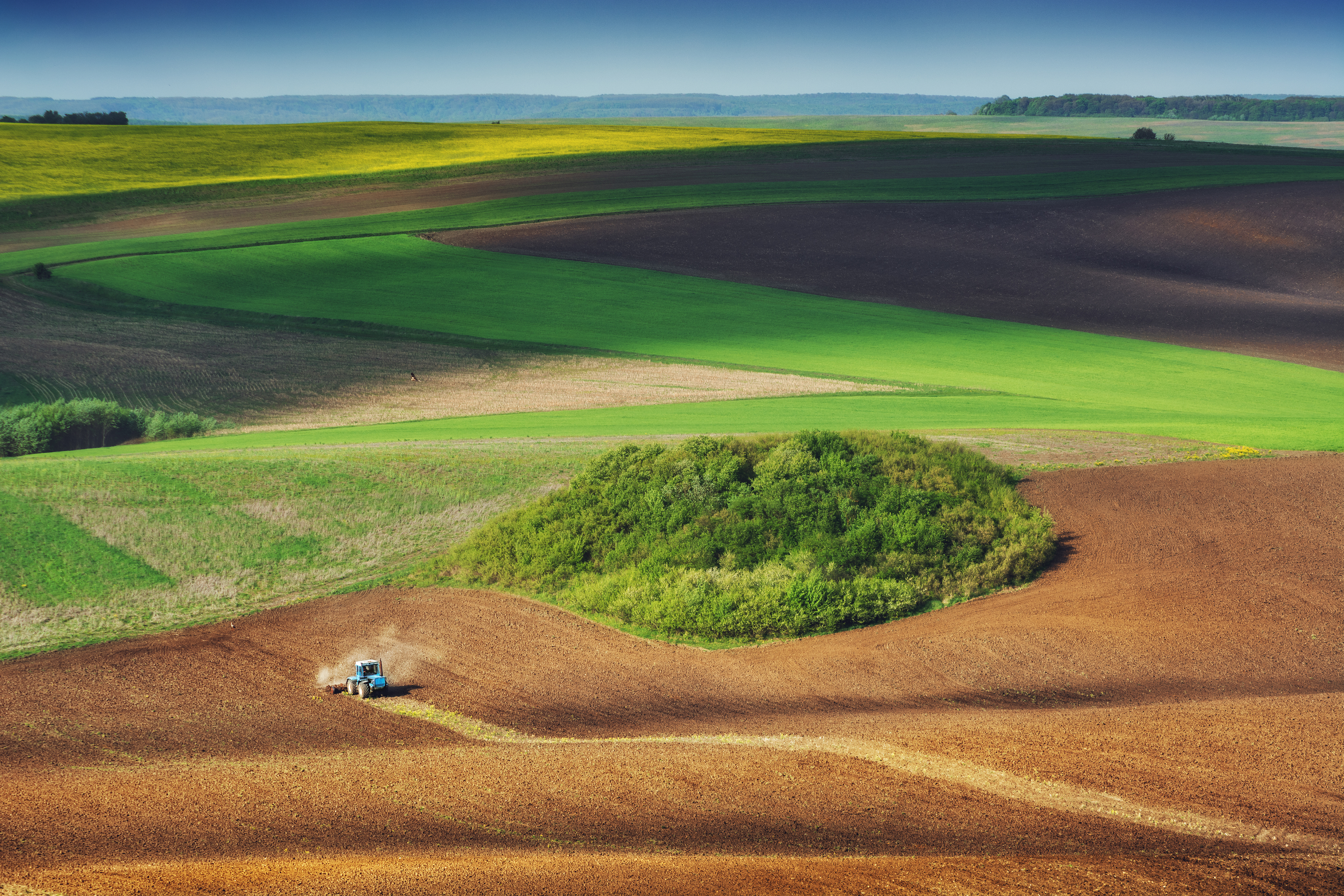
Agricultural works in Ivano-Frankivsk Oblast

- a zone of sandy podzolized soils
- a central belt consisting of the extremely fertile Ukrainian black earth (chernozems)
- a zone of chestnut and salinized soils

As much as two-thirds of the country's surface land consists of black earth, a resource that has made Ukraine one of the most fertile regions in the world and well known as a "breadbasket". These soils may be divided into three broad groups:

- in the north, a belt of deep chernozems, about 1.5 metres (5 feet) thick and rich in humus
- south and east of the former, a zone of prairie, or ordinary, chernozems, which are equally rich in humus but only about 90 centimetres (3 feet) thick
- the southernmost belt, which is even thinner and has still less humus

Interspersed in various uplands and along the northern and western perimeters of the deep chernozems are mixtures of gray forest soils and podzolized black-earth soils, which together occupy much of Ukraine's remaining area. All these soils are very fertile when sufficient water is available. However, their intensive cultivation, especially on steep slopes, has led to widespread soil erosion and gullying.

The smallest proportion of the soil cover consists of the chestnut soils of the southern and eastern regions. They become increasingly salinized to the south as they approach the Black Sea.

== Hydrography ==
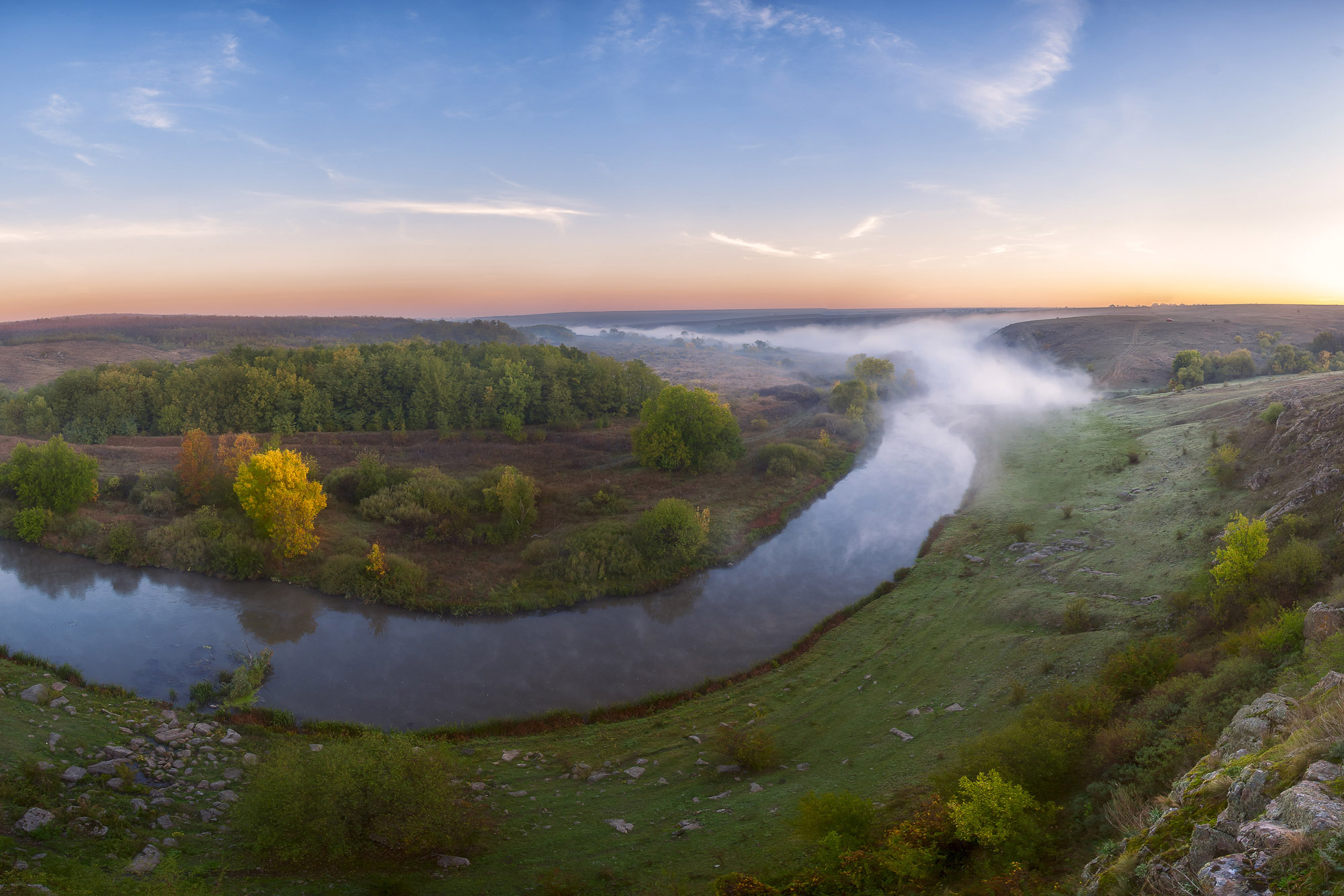
Kalmius river, Donetsk

The territory of Ukraine is bordered by the waters of the Black Sea and the Sea of Azov. More than 95% of the rivers are part of those two seas' drainage basins. A few rivers are part of the Baltic Sea basin. There are seven major rivers in Ukraine: Desna, Dnipro, Dnister, Danube, Prypiat, Siverian Donets, and Southern Buh.

== Climate ==
Ukraine map of Köppen climate classification.

2071–2099 map under the most intense climate change scenario. Mid-range scenarios are currently considered more likely

Average daily maximum and minimum temperatures for the seven largest cities in Ukraine
Location	July (°C)	July (°F)	January (°C)	January (°F)
Kyiv	27/17	80/62	−1/−6	31/22
Kharkiv	27/17	81/62	−2/−7	28/20
Dnipro	29/17	84/63	−1/−6	30/21
Odesa	28/19	82/66	2/−3	36/27
Donetsk	27/16	81/61	−1/−6	29/20
Zaporizhzhia	28/16	83/61	−0/−5	31/21
Lviv	24/13	75/56	−1/−8	32/21

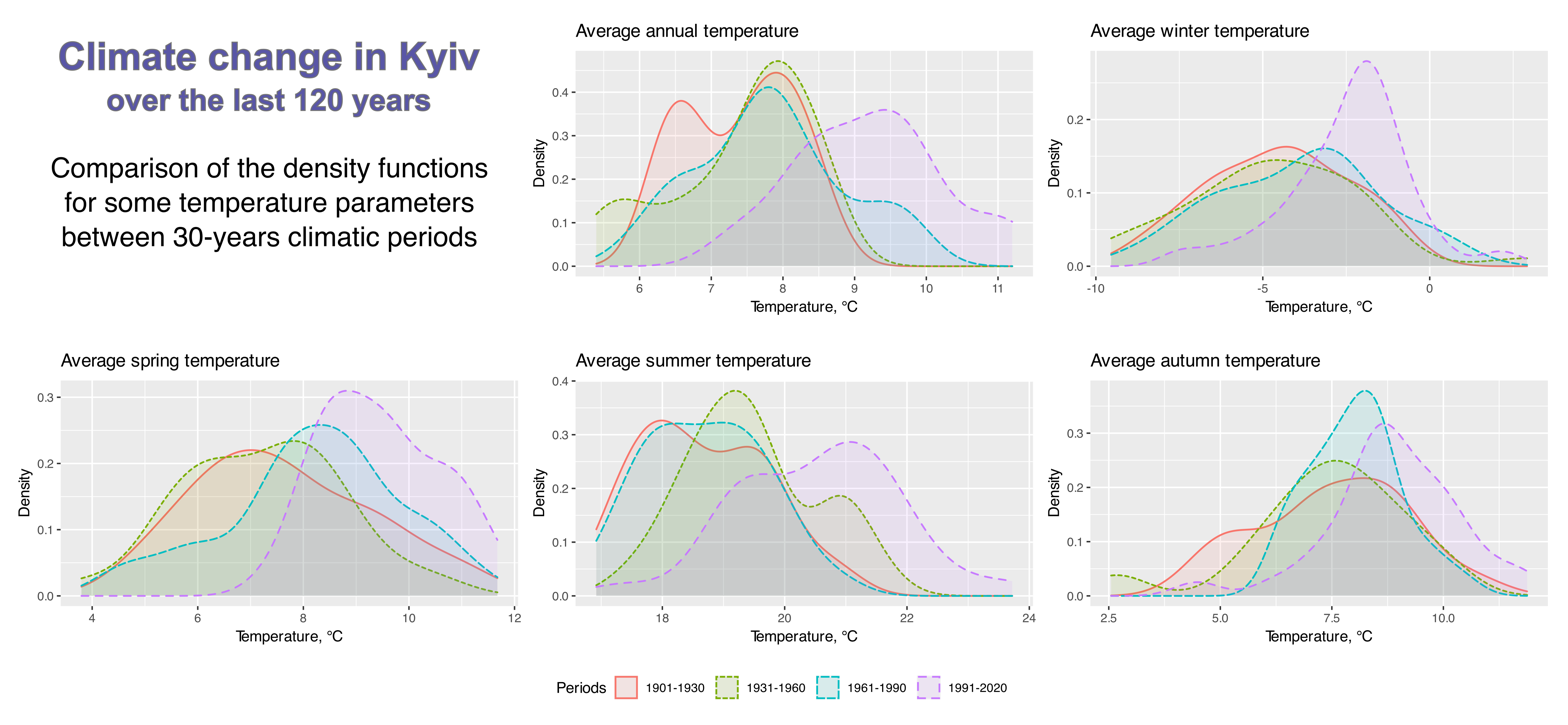
Visualisation of climate change in Kyiv, showing different temperature ranges between different 30-year time periods.

Ukraine is firmly in the mid-latitudes, and generally has a continental climate, except for its southern coasts, which feature cold semi-arid and humid subtropical climates. Average annual temperatures range from 5.5–7 °C (41.9–44.6 °F) in the north, to 11–13 °C (51.8–55.4 °F) in the south. Precipitation is disproportionately distributed; it is highest in the west and north and lowest in the east and southeast. Western Ukraine, particularly in the Carpathian Mountains, receives around 1,200 millimetres (47.2 in) of precipitation annually, while Crimea and the coastal areas of the Black Sea receive around 400 millimetres (15.7 in).

Water availability from the major river basins is expected to decrease, especially in summer. This poses risks to the agricultural sector. The negative impacts of climate change on agriculture are mostly felt in the south of the country, which has a steppe climate. In the north, some crops may be able to benefit from a longer growing season. The World Bank has stated that Ukraine is highly vulnerable to climate change.

Climate data for Kyiv (1991–2020, extremes 1881–present)
Month	Jan	Feb	Mar	Apr	May	Jun	Jul	Aug	Sep	Oct	Nov	Dec	Year
Record high °C (°F)	13.2 (55.8)	17.3 (63.1)	22.4 (72.3)	30.2 (86.4)	33.6 (92.5)	35.5 (95.9)	39.4 (102.9)	39.3 (102.7)	35.7 (96.3)	27.9 (82.2)	23.2 (73.8)	15.2 (59.4)	39.4 (102.9)
Mean daily maximum °C (°F)	−0.8 (30.6)	0.7 (33.3)	6.5 (43.7)	15.0 (59.0)	21.1 (70.0)	24.6 (76.3)	26.5 (79.7)	25.9 (78.6)	20.0 (68.0)	12.9 (55.2)	5.3 (41.5)	0.5 (32.9)	13.2 (55.8)
Daily mean °C (°F)	−3.2 (26.2)	−2.3 (27.9)	2.5 (36.5)	10.0 (50.0)	15.8 (60.4)	19.5 (67.1)	21.3 (70.3)	20.5 (68.9)	14.9 (58.8)	8.6 (47.5)	2.6 (36.7)	−1.8 (28.8)	9.0 (48.2)
Mean daily minimum °C (°F)	−5.5 (22.1)	−5.0 (23.0)	−0.8 (30.6)	5.7 (42.3)	10.9 (51.6)	14.8 (58.6)	16.7 (62.1)	15.7 (60.3)	10.6 (51.1)	5.1 (41.2)	0.4 (32.7)	−3.9 (25.0)	5.4 (41.7)
Record low °C (°F)	−31.1 (−24.0)	−32.2 (−26.0)	−24.9 (−12.8)	−10.4 (13.3)	−2.4 (27.7)	2.5 (36.5)	5.8 (42.4)	3.3 (37.9)	−2.9 (26.8)	−17.8 (0.0)	−21.9 (−7.4)	−30.0 (−22.0)	−32.2 (−26.0)
Average precipitation mm (inches)	38 (1.5)	40 (1.6)	40 (1.6)	42 (1.7)	65 (2.6)	73 (2.9)	68 (2.7)	56 (2.2)	57 (2.2)	46 (1.8)	46 (1.8)	47 (1.9)	618 (24.3)
Average extreme snow depth cm (inches)	9 (3.5)	11 (4.3)	7 (2.8)	0 (0)	0 (0)	0 (0)	0 (0)	0 (0)	0 (0)	0 (0)	2 (0.8)	5 (2.0)	11 (4.3)
Average rainy days	8	7	9	13	14	15	14	11	14	12	12	9	138
Average snowy days	17	17	10	2	0.2	0	0	0	0.03	2	9	16	73
Average relative humidity (%)	82.7	80.1	74.0	64.3	62.0	67.5	68.3	66.9	73.5	77.4	84.6	85.6	73.9
Mean monthly sunshine hours	42	64	112	162	257	273	287	252	189	123	51	31	1,843
Average ultraviolet index	1	1	2	4	6	7	6	6	4	2	1	1	3
Source 1: Pogoda.ru.net, Central Observatory for Geophysics (extremes), World Meteorological Organization (humidity 1981–2010)
Source 2: Danish Meteorological Institute (sun, 1931–1960) and Weather Atlas

Climate data for Kharkiv (1991−2020, extremes 1936–present)
Month	Jan	Feb	Mar	Apr	May	Jun	Jul	Aug	Sep	Oct	Nov	Dec	Year
Record high °C (°F)	11.1 (52.0)	14.6 (58.3)	21.8 (71.2)	30.5 (86.9)	34.5 (94.1)	39.8 (103.6)	38.4 (101.1)	39.8 (103.6)	34.7 (94.5)	29.3 (84.7)	20.3 (68.5)	13.4 (56.1)	39.8 (103.6)
Mean daily maximum °C (°F)	−2.1 (28.2)	−0.8 (30.6)	5.2 (41.4)	14.7 (58.5)	21.4 (70.5)	25.2 (77.4)	27.4 (81.3)	26.8 (80.2)	20.5 (68.9)	12.6 (54.7)	4.3 (39.7)	−0.7 (30.7)	12.9 (55.2)
Daily mean °C (°F)	−4.5 (23.9)	−3.8 (25.2)	1.4 (34.5)	9.7 (49.5)	16.1 (61.0)	20.0 (68.0)	22.0 (71.6)	21.1 (70.0)	15.1 (59.2)	8.2 (46.8)	1.6 (34.9)	−2.9 (26.8)	8.7 (47.7)
Mean daily minimum °C (°F)	−6.8 (19.8)	−6.6 (20.1)	−1.9 (28.6)	4.8 (40.6)	10.7 (51.3)	14.7 (58.5)	16.6 (61.9)	15.4 (59.7)	10.2 (50.4)	4.4 (39.9)	−0.8 (30.6)	−5.1 (22.8)	4.6 (40.3)
Record low °C (°F)	−35.6 (−32.1)	−29.8 (−21.6)	−32.2 (−26.0)	−11.4 (11.5)	−1.9 (28.6)	2.2 (36.0)	5.7 (42.3)	2.2 (36.0)	−2.9 (26.8)	−9.1 (15.6)	−20.9 (−5.6)	−30.8 (−23.4)	−35.6 (−32.1)
Average precipitation mm (inches)	37 (1.5)	33 (1.3)	36 (1.4)	32 (1.3)	54 (2.1)	58 (2.3)	63 (2.5)	39 (1.5)	44 (1.7)	44 (1.7)	39 (1.5)	40 (1.6)	519 (20.4)
Average extreme snow depth cm (inches)	8 (3.1)	11 (4.3)	8 (3.1)	1 (0.4)	0 (0)	0 (0)	0 (0)	0 (0)	0 (0)	0 (0)	1 (0.4)	4 (1.6)	11 (4.3)
Average rainy days	10	8	10	13	14	15	13	10	12	13	13	12	143
Average snowy days	19	18	12	2	0.1	0	0	0	0.03	2	9	18	80
Average relative humidity (%)	85.6	83.0	77.3	65.7	60.9	65.2	65.3	62.9	70.2	77.6	85.7	86.5	73.8
Mean monthly sunshine hours	41.5	63.3	123.5	166.7	252.9	266.6	278.0	262.4	176.6	112.8	51.0	31.4	1,826.7
Source 1: Pogoda.ru.net
Source 2: World Meteorological Organization (humidity and sun 1981–2010)

Climate data for Dnipro (1991–2020, extremes 1948–present)
Month	Jan	Feb	Mar	Apr	May	Jun	Jul	Aug	Sep	Oct	Nov	Dec	Year
Record high °C (°F)	12.3 (54.1)	17.5 (63.5)	24.1 (75.4)	31.8 (89.2)	36.1 (97.0)	37.8 (100.0)	39.8 (103.6)	40.9 (105.6)	36.5 (97.7)	32.6 (90.7)	20.6 (69.1)	13.7 (56.7)	40.9 (105.6)
Mean daily maximum °C (°F)	−0.9 (30.4)	0.6 (33.1)	7.1 (44.8)	16.0 (60.8)	22.7 (72.9)	26.6 (79.9)	29.1 (84.4)	28.7 (83.7)	22.4 (72.3)	14.4 (57.9)	5.8 (42.4)	0.6 (33.1)	14.4 (57.9)
Daily mean °C (°F)	−3.6 (25.5)	−2.8 (27.0)	2.5 (36.5)	10.3 (50.5)	16.5 (61.7)	20.5 (68.9)	22.7 (72.9)	22.1 (71.8)	16.2 (61.2)	9.2 (48.6)	2.6 (36.7)	−1.9 (28.6)	9.5 (49.1)
Mean daily minimum °C (°F)	−6.1 (21.0)	−5.8 (21.6)	−1.2 (29.8)	5.1 (41.2)	10.9 (51.6)	15.1 (59.2)	17.1 (62.8)	16.3 (61.3)	11.0 (51.8)	5.2 (41.4)	−0.1 (31.8)	−4.2 (24.4)	5.3 (41.5)
Record low °C (°F)	−30.0 (−22.0)	−27.8 (−18.0)	−19.2 (−2.6)	−8.0 (17.6)	−2.4 (27.7)	3.9 (39.0)	5.9 (42.6)	3.9 (39.0)	−3.0 (26.6)	−8.0 (17.6)	−17.9 (−0.2)	−27.8 (−18.0)	−30.0 (−22.0)
Average precipitation mm (inches)	50 (2.0)	43 (1.7)	51 (2.0)	39 (1.5)	51 (2.0)	64 (2.5)	55 (2.2)	45 (1.8)	42 (1.7)	39 (1.5)	44 (1.7)	46 (1.8)	569 (22.4)
Average extreme snow depth cm (inches)	7 (2.8)	10 (3.9)	5 (2.0)	0 (0)	0 (0)	0 (0)	0 (0)	0 (0)	0 (0)	0 (0)	1 (0.4)	4 (1.6)	10 (3.9)
Average rainy days	9	8	11	13	13	13	12	9	10	11	12	11	132
Average snowy days	16	15	9	1	0	0	0	0	0	1	7	15	64
Average relative humidity (%)	87.7	84.6	79.2	66.8	62.2	66.2	64.7	62.4	69.5	77.2	86.5	88.3	74.6
Mean monthly sunshine hours	45.2	70.7	126.3	179.0	264.9	269.5	299.0	277.5	197.3	132.1	58.2	34.4	1,954.1
Source 1: Pogoda.ru.net
Source 2: World Meteorological Organization (humidity and sun 1981–2010)

Climate data for Odesa (1991–2020, extremes 1894–present)
Month	Jan	Feb	Mar	Apr	May	Jun	Jul	Aug	Sep	Oct	Nov	Dec	Year
Record high °C (°F)	15.7 (60.3)	19.2 (66.6)	24.1 (75.4)	29.4 (84.9)	33.2 (91.8)	37.2 (99.0)	39.3 (102.7)	38.0 (100.4)	35.4 (95.7)	30.5 (86.9)	26.0 (78.8)	16.9 (62.4)	39.3 (102.7)
Mean daily maximum °C (°F)	2.3 (36.1)	3.4 (38.1)	7.7 (45.9)	13.6 (56.5)	20.3 (68.5)	25.1 (77.2)	27.9 (82.2)	27.7 (81.9)	21.8 (71.2)	15.3 (59.5)	9.1 (48.4)	4.2 (39.6)	14.9 (58.8)
Daily mean °C (°F)	−0.4 (31.3)	0.4 (32.7)	4.3 (39.7)	10.0 (50.0)	16.2 (61.2)	20.8 (69.4)	23.4 (74.1)	23.1 (73.6)	17.8 (64.0)	12.0 (53.6)	6.3 (43.3)	1.5 (34.7)	11.3 (52.3)
Mean daily minimum °C (°F)	−2.7 (27.1)	−2.1 (28.2)	1.6 (34.9)	6.9 (44.4)	12.6 (54.7)	16.9 (62.4)	19.1 (66.4)	18.5 (65.3)	14.0 (57.2)	8.9 (48.0)	3.9 (39.0)	−0.8 (30.6)	8.1 (46.6)
Record low °C (°F)	−26.2 (−15.2)	−28.0 (−18.4)	−16.0 (3.2)	−5.9 (21.4)	0.3 (32.5)	5.2 (41.4)	7.5 (45.5)	7.9 (46.2)	−0.8 (30.6)	−13.3 (8.1)	−14.6 (5.7)	−19.6 (−3.3)	−28.0 (−18.4)
Average precipitation mm (inches)	43 (1.7)	35 (1.4)	35 (1.4)	28 (1.1)	39 (1.5)	47 (1.9)	45 (1.8)	40 (1.6)	44 (1.7)	37 (1.5)	39 (1.5)	38 (1.5)	470 (18.5)
Average extreme snow depth cm (inches)	2 (0.8)	2 (0.8)	1 (0.4)	0 (0)	0 (0)	0 (0)	0 (0)	0 (0)	0 (0)	0 (0)	0 (0)	1 (0.4)	2 (0.8)
Average rainy days	9	7	10	11	12	13	10	8	9	10	13	10	122
Average snowy days	11	10	6	0.4	0	0	0	0	0	0.2	4	9	41
Average relative humidity (%)	82.5	80.7	78.4	74.5	71.0	70.6	66.0	65.4	71.8	77.1	81.9	83.6	75.3
Mean monthly sunshine hours	63.2	91.6	142.2	199.5	292.5	307.5	332.9	313.1	234.6	164.7	73.0	57.4	2,272.2
Source 1: Pogoda.ru
Source 2: World Meteorological Organization (humidity and sun 1981–2010)

Climate data for Yalta (1991–2020 normals, extremes 1948–present)
Month	Jan	Feb	Mar	Apr	May	Jun	Jul	Aug	Sep	Oct	Nov	Dec	Year
Record high °C (°F)	17.8 (64.0)	20.2 (68.4)	27.8 (82.0)	28.5 (83.3)	33.0 (91.4)	35.0 (95.0)	39.1 (102.4)	39.1 (102.4)	33.2 (91.8)	31.5 (88.7)	25.2 (77.4)	22.0 (71.6)	39.1 (102.4)
Mean daily maximum °C (°F)	7.4 (45.3)	7.7 (45.9)	10.4 (50.7)	14.8 (58.6)	20.5 (68.9)	25.7 (78.3)	29.1 (84.4)	29.4 (84.9)	24.2 (75.6)	18.3 (64.9)	12.8 (55.0)	8.9 (48.0)	17.4 (63.3)
Daily mean °C (°F)	4.6 (40.3)	4.6 (40.3)	6.8 (44.2)	11.1 (52.0)	16.4 (61.5)	21.6 (70.9)	24.8 (76.6)	25.0 (77.0)	20.1 (68.2)	14.6 (58.3)	9.7 (49.5)	6.3 (43.3)	13.8 (56.8)
Mean daily minimum °C (°F)	2.5 (36.5)	2.2 (36.0)	4.1 (39.4)	8.1 (46.6)	13.1 (55.6)	18.1 (64.6)	21.1 (70.0)	21.5 (70.7)	16.8 (62.2)	11.7 (53.1)	7.2 (45.0)	4.1 (39.4)	10.9 (51.6)
Record low °C (°F)	−12.2 (10.0)	−12.3 (9.9)	−7.3 (18.9)	−3.8 (25.2)	2.8 (37.0)	7.8 (46.0)	12.4 (54.3)	10.0 (50.0)	3.9 (39.0)	−1.1 (30.0)	−8.9 (16.0)	−7.4 (18.7)	−12.3 (9.9)
Average precipitation mm (inches)	76 (3.0)	56 (2.2)	48 (1.9)	29 (1.1)	36 (1.4)	35 (1.4)	32 (1.3)	43 (1.7)	43 (1.7)	52 (2.0)	57 (2.2)	84 (3.3)	591 (23.3)
Average extreme snow depth cm (inches)	1 (0.4)	1 (0.4)	1 (0.4)	0 (0)	0 (0)	0 (0)	0 (0)	0 (0)	0 (0)	0 (0)	0 (0)	0 (0)	1 (0.4)
Average rainy days	14	12	13	12	11	10	8	7	10	10	12	15	134
Average snowy days	6	6	4	0.2	0	0	0	0	0	0	1	3	20
Average relative humidity (%)	75.7	73.6	72.7	72.0	69.7	67.7	61.9	61.5	65.4	71.5	74.4	75.1	70.1
Mean monthly sunshine hours	68.6	85.1	133.3	174.9	239.2	273.2	308.1	280.6	216.2	145.1	89.3	63.2	2,076.8
Source 1: Pogoda.ru.net
Source 2: World Meteorological Organization (humidity and sun 1981–2010)

== Natural resources ==
Significant natural resources in Ukraine include: iron ore, manganese, natural gas, titanium, kaolin, uranium, and arable land.

== Environmental issues ==
Ukraine has many environmental issues. Some regions lack adequate supplies of potable water. Air and water pollution affects the country, as well as deforestation, and radiation contamination in the northeast stemming from the 1986 accident at the Chernobyl Nuclear Power Plant.

== See also ==
- Extreme points of Ukraine
- Maps of Ukraine
