= Geology of Russia =

Coordinates: 60°N 100°E

A topographic map of Russia with regions labeled.

The geology of Russia, the world's largest country, which extends over much of northern Eurasia, consists of several stable cratons and sedimentary platforms bounded by orogenic (mountain) belts.

European Russia is on the East European craton, at the heart of which is a complex of igneous and metamorphic rocks dating back to the Precambrian. The craton is bounded on the east by the long tract of compressed and highly deformed rock that constitutes the Ural orogen. In Asiatic Russia, the area between the Ural Mountains and the Yenisei River is the young West Siberian Plain. East of the Yenisei River is the ancient Central Siberian Plateau, extending to the Lena River. East of the Lena River there is the Verhoyansk-Chukotka collision zone, stretching to the Chukchi Peninsula.

The orogens within Russia belong to the Baltic Shield, the Timanides, the Urals, the Altai Mountains, the Ural-Mongolian epipaleozoic orogen and the northwestern part of the Pacific orogeny. The country's highest mountains, the Caucasus, are confined to younger orogens.

== East European craton ==
The European part of Russia lies on the East European platform, a region up to 3,000 kilometres (1,900 mi) wide covered by more than 3 kilometres (1.9 mi) of metamorphosed sediments dating back to the Riphean age (middle to late Proterozoic, from 1,400 to 800 million years ago). These sediments lie on the East European craton, a remnant of Precambrian continental crust composed of magmatic and metamorphic rocks. The East European craton itself was created between 2.0 and 1.7 billion years ago when the microcontinents of Fennoscandia, Sarmatia and Volgo-Uralia collided.

=== Timan Ridge ===
The Timan Ridge (Тиманский кряж – Timansky Kryazh) lies west of the Northern Ural mountains. It strikes northwest–southeast, extending from the settlement of Troitsko-Pechorsk to the Kanin Peninsula. This ridge can be correlated with outcrops on the Varanger Peninsula which together form the Timan-Varanger belt. The Timan-Varanger belt consists of Neoproterozoic (late Precambrian) sediments that were metamorphosed and deformed during the Timanian (or Baikalian) orogeny, a late Neoproterozoic mountain-building event coincident with the Cadomian orogeny in western Europe.

=== Timan-Pechora Basin ===
The Timan-Pechora Basin is a sedimentary basin that lies between the Timan Ridge and the Urals foreland basin. The basin extends into the southern part of the Barents Sea and includes Kolguyev Island. It is covered by 6 to 12 kilometres (3.7 to 7.5 mi) of sediments that were deposited during a series of marine regression and transgression events from the Proterozoic to the Cenozoic. The eastern basin was deformed when the Ural mountains were formed. The Basin is further divided into the Izhma-Pechora basin, Pechora-Kolva basin, Khoreiver basin and the Northern Pre-Urals.

=== Volgo-Uralian Block ===
The Volgo-Uralian Block is a basement of Archean craton covered by younger sediments, making up the eastern third of the East European Craton. This crystalline basement is made up of amphibolite to granulite facies, mostly forming domes. Granitoids deformed into gneisses are contained. The sedimentary rocks covering these domes are of Neoproterozoic to Phanerozoic age.

== Caucasus Mountains ==
The Arabian Plate has been converging towards the East European craton at 29 mm/yr; however, subduction has not occurred because of the presence of three blocks separating the plate and craton. The convergence has forced up the Caucasus Mountains. The core of the mountains is mostly composed of metasedimentary Paleozoic rocks.

Deformation outside the core has mostly taken place on the southern slopes of the mountains; however, there is some deformation on the North slopes. This deformation is differentiated on the north slopes from East to West. In the west, some thrusting to the North of the Crest has taken place into the Kuban Basin. When the thrusting die out the north slopes of the central Greater Caucasus form a basement uplift, forming a monocline dipping North. Dagestan to the Eastern end of the range is where the most thrusting to the North occurs and has formed a folded zone of sediments, overlying some of the Terek Basin.

== Caspian Basin ==
The Caspian Basin is a system of basins and platforms. It is divided into smaller basins, in the North, the North Caspian Basin. The north is a basin at the edge of the cratons to the north. It is composed of Paleozoic carbonate platforms. The North Basin overlies a basement of European Craton. Mesozoic and Tertiary sediments deposited by a variety of methods have covered the continental crust.

== Ural orogen ==
The Ural Mountains, a 2,500 kilometre (1,600 mi) long mountain chain that runs north–south at approximately 60° E longitude, formed in the Ural orogeny, a long series of mountain-building events occurring at the eastern margin of what is now the East European craton in association with its collision with another microcontinent (the Kazakhstania terrane) to the east. The first phase of orogenic development occurred in the late Devonian and early Carboniferous, when volcanic island arcs developed and accreted to the continental margin. During the subsequent collision stage, extensive folding, faulting, and metamorphism occurred. Deformation during the collision stage propagated from the south northwards, reaching the Pay-Khoy mountains during the Jurassic. The strong influence of strike-slip movements during the orogeny caused the unusual straightness of the mountain chain.

== West Siberian basin ==
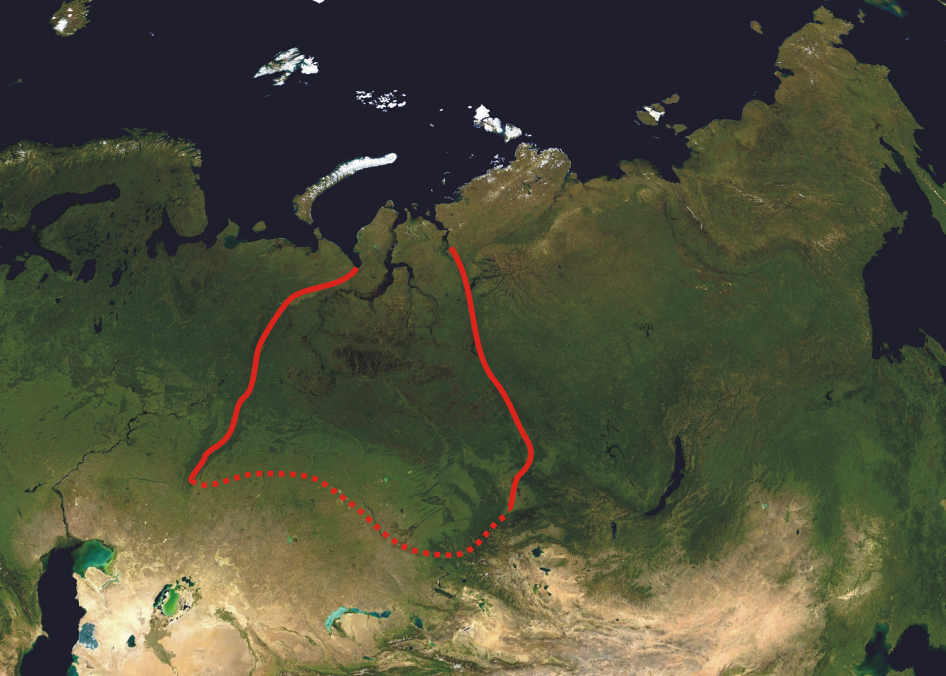
Western Siberian plain on a satellite map of North Asia.

The West Siberian basin lies between the Ural mountains and the Siberian craton to its east. It corresponds to the geographic region of the West Siberian Plain. Deposition in rift valleys resulting from prolonged subsidence of the Triassic Koltogor-Urengoy graben in an intra-cratonic sag basin beginning in the Jurassic has resulted in a thick 'basin fill' of sedimentary deposits ranging from Jurassic to Cenozoic in age. There are two major north–south trending rift structures of Triassic age buried beneath the basin fill: the Urengoy and the Khudosey rift. These rifts are mainly filled with Lower Triassic basic volcanic rocks.

The West Siberian basin and its offshore portions in the south Kara sea are the largest oil province in the world. It has an area of 2,200,000 square kilometres (850,000 mi^{2}) and the USGS estimates oil and gas reserves of 360 billion barrels of oil equivalent in the basin.

== Yenisey fold belt ==
Dividing the Siberian craton from the West Siberian basin is the Yenisey fold belt, which extends about 700 kilometres (430 mi), with NW-SE strike. This belt is divided into northern and southern regions by the Angara fault which has left slip. Much of the rock was formed by Neoprotozoic accretion.

North of the fault, the area is made up of thrust sheets divided into three primarily Neoproterozoic terranes, the East Angara, Central Angara and the Isakov. Each one overrides another, and volcanism is generally limited to the Central and Isakov terranes. South of the fault are the Predivinsk terrane, made of island arc accretion, and the Angara-Kan micro-craton, which is sometimes considered separate from the fold belt.

== Siberian craton ==
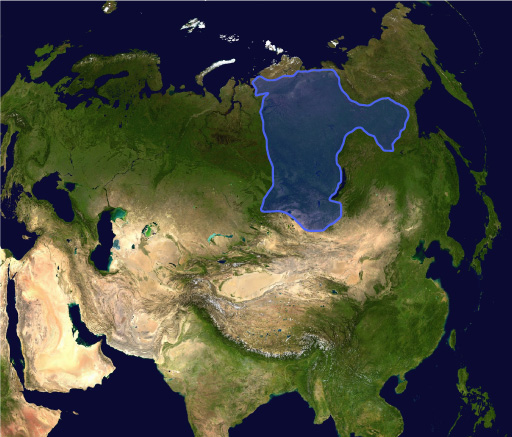
Central Siberian Plateau's location in Asia.

The Siberian craton (or West-Siberian craton) coincides with the Central Siberian plateau that lies between the Yenisei and Lena rivers. In the west it borders the West Siberian basin. The Yenisei-Katanga trough lies in the north. In the south lies the Central Asian fold belt, the Baikal rift and the Mongol-Okhotsk fold belt. The eastern border is the Verkhoyansk-Kolyma orogenic system.

The Siberian craton formed in the Precambrian and is largely covered by sedimentary and volcanic rocks of more recent age. Precambrian rocks are exposed in two distinct uplifts, the Anabar massif in the northeast and the Aldanian shield in the southeast. Other basement outcrops include Olenyok, Sharyzhalgay and the raised Southern Yenisei horst.

Basins include the Tunguska basin, the Vilui basin (Viluiskaya-Tunguska syncline), the Low-Angara (Angara-Lena trough) basin, and the Kan-Taseeva basin.

The volcanically produced Siberian Traps, the largest flood basalts of the Phanerozoic (the last 539 million years), mantle about 40 percent of the Siberian craton.

The Siberian craton is known for its large mineral resources. The town of Norilsk is the world's largest supplier of nickel. In 2011 one-fifth of the world's production of this metal came from Russia.

== Verhoyansk-Chukotka collision zone ==
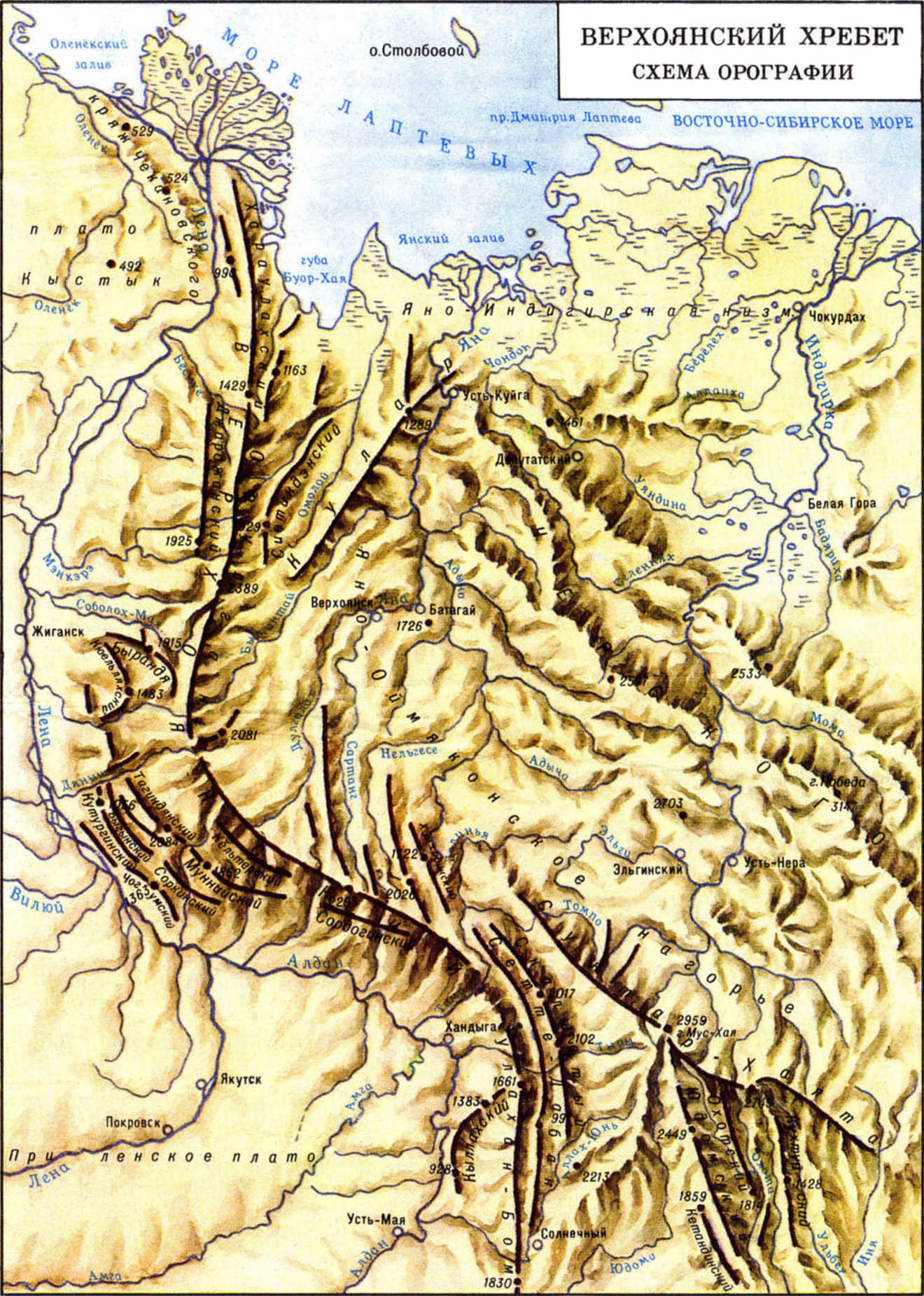
Lena River and Verkhoyansk Range (East Siberia).

The Verhoyansk-Chukotka collision zone is commonly divided into the Verhoyansk-Kolyma and the Novosibirsk-Chukotka (or Novosibirsk-Chukchi) orogens. It stretches from the Lena river in the west to the Chukchi Peninsula in the east.

=== Verkhoyansk-Kolyma orogen ===
The Verkhoyansk-Kolyma orogen is composed of three parts: the Verkhoyansk fold-and-thrust belt, the Chersky collisional zone, and the Kolyma-Omolon microcontinent. The Verkhoyansk fold-and-thrust belt consists of a sedimentary succession, most of which was deposited between the Carboniferous and Middle Jurassic. The Lena River runs along the most frontal, or most western thrust of the Verkhoyansk fold and thrust belt. In the east of the Verkhoyansk lies the Chersky collisional belt. It consists of late Permian to Jurassic oceanic turbidites and volcanic deposits that are folded and were intruded by molten granite in the Cretaceous. The Kolyma-Omolon microcontinent formed when the Prikolyma and Omolon terranes collided with the Alazeya island arc (or Alazeya-Oloy volcanic arc). When the Kolyma-Omolon microcontinent collided with the Siberian craton the sedimentary stack of the Verhoyansk was folded and uplifted. Deformation took place between the Middle Jurassic and Upper Cretaceous.

=== Novosibirsk-Chukotka orogen ===
The Novosibirsk-Chukotka orogen lies in the northeasternmost part of Russia on the Chukchi Peninsula and also is exposed on the island of New Siberia, Anzhu Islands. The orogen is composed of metamorphic basement rocks and cover made up of shallow water sediments, deposited between the Permian and the Triassic. The Chukchi massif is an outcrop of Precambrian basement that stretches to the Seward Peninsula in Alaska. The Novosibirsk-Chukotka orogen is connected under the Chukchi Sea with the Brooks fold-and-thrust belt in Alaska.

== Central Asian Orogenic Belt ==
The Central Asian Orogenic Belt is an orogen that covers much of Central Asia, extending from the Urals to the Pacific and dividing the Siberian and Eastern European cratons from the North China and Tarim cratons. It has been accepted that the belt was formed by accretion, but there is debate over the relative timing and nature of the various accretions. The accretion orogens form one of the largest areas of continental growth, representing 800 Ma of development. The part of the Belt in Russia is believed to have formed when the Kokchetav and Altai-Mongolian terranes collided with the Siberia Craton. The Altai Structures reach into Russia, representing the extent of a mobile belt primarily lying south of the border. This is known as the Altai-Sayan orogen and is part of the belt present in Russia, along with the Transbaikalia and Primorje orogens.

== Baikal-Stanovoy Region ==
The Baikal–Stanovoy region is commonly held to be caused by various factors to account for the differing structures throughout the region. The Baikal-Stanovoy seismic belt underlies the region and is a long thin activity region. Compressive stresses dominate the eastern Stanovoy Ranges, whereas the Baikal rift zone is an extension zone.

=== Baikal Rift Zone ===
The Baikal rift zone is an extension zone separating the Siberian platform from the Sayan Baikal range. This zone is revealed by a series of basins more than 2,000 kilometres (1,200 mi) long. Some strike-slip action also takes place in the area. The driving forces of the rift are unknown; however, possibilities include the subduction of the Pacific Plate and the collision of the Indian subcontinent with Eurasia. Locally, there may be a mantle up-welling driving the extension.

The area was originally characterized by Precambrian and Paleozoic northeast-southwest fold and thrust belts. Volcanism began in the late Cretaceous in limited areas, but is mostly limited to the Miocene. It is also the age of sedimentary rocks in some basins, and the same series lasted into the Eocene. Rifting resumed beginning in the Oligocene, and is commonly held to have increased since the middle Pliocene, causing the formation of basins in the form of grabens. The new rift structure may follow the Precambrian and Paleozoic faults. Magmatic activity and rifting may also be independent events. Outside of the grabens basalt volcanics erupted from either end of the rift system during the uplift. The grabens mostly spread without releasing magma, except the Tunka depression.

=== Dzhugdzhur and Stanovoy Ranges ===
The Dzhugdzhur Range and Stanovoy Range are two eastern mountain ranges, where the Stonovoy is west of the Dzhugdzhur. Together the ranges make up a folded block structure, which first formed during the Archean and Proterozoic.

The Stanovoy range is composed of granodiorite batholiths, mostly of the Udskaya series, which contains Mesozoic massifs in the form of intrusions of granite, granodiorite, and diorite. Seismic activity in the area is found in an east trending narrow zone, called the Stanovoy strike-slip zone. In the range, this belt is revealed by strike-slip displacement. This left fault joins the Sea of Okhotsk to the Sakhalin deformation zones. The belt formed by this zone extends to lake Baikal. The area is under compressive stresses.

The Dzhugdzhur range has a basement formed out of a block which is from the early Proterozoic. It is sometimes considered part of the Aldan Shield. It contains a late Archean granulite basement. This basement can be broken into two sequences, the lower is primarily a plagiogneiss-enderbite, and the upper is made up of biotite and gneisses and garnets mixed with biotite.

== Okhotsk-Chukotka Volcanic Belt ==
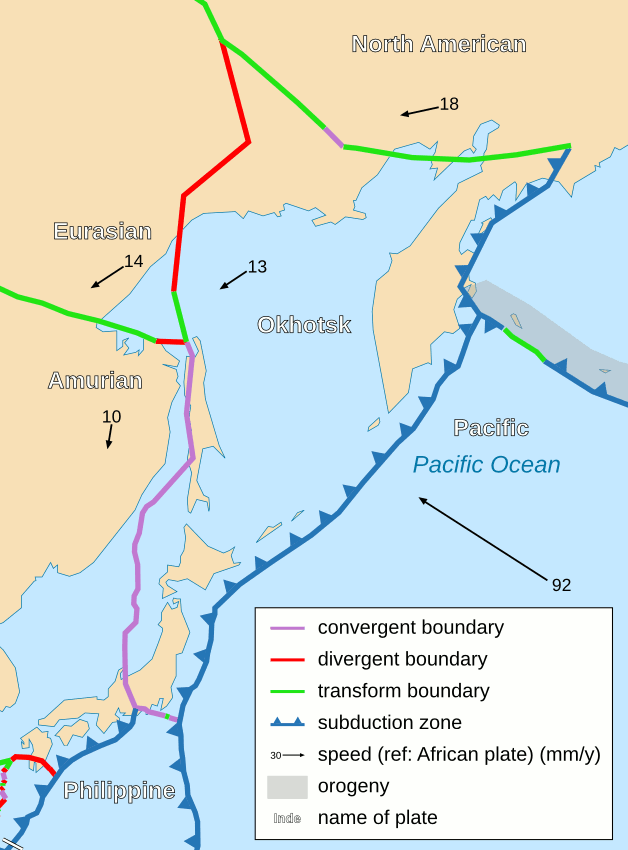
Map of the Okhotsk Plate and its neighbouring plates.

The Okhotsk-Chukotka Volcanic Belt stretches 3,000 kilometres (1,900 mi) from the settlement of Okhotsk and runs along the northern shore of the Sea of Okhotsk. In the Shelikhov Gulf the belt runs northeast across most of the Chukchi Peninsula and then bends southeast and runs along the Pacific shoreline and terminates between the peninsula and St. Lawrence Island.

The Okhotsk-Chukotka Volcanic Belt was formed during the Cretaceous by the subduction of the Kula or Isanagai oceanic plate under the Verkhoyansk-Chukotka orogen. The activity ended with the subduction moving farther east.

Mineral resources found in the Okhotsk-Chukotka belt include gold, silver, tin and mercury.

== Pacific rim orogenies ==
=== Kuril Islands arc ===
The Kuril arc is a 2,300 kilometre (1,400 mi) long chain of volcanic islands stretching from the Kamchatka peninsula to Hokkaido (Japan). The islands formed as a part of the Kurile-Kamchatkan subduction system when the Pacific Plate started to subduct under the Okhotsk Plate during the Paleogene. This process is still active today with 40 of its 100 volcanoes being active. Currently the subduction is oblique and progressing at 8.6 centimetres (3.4 in) per year. The Kuril–Kamchatka Trench on the Pacific side of the islands is one of the deepest ones known, with parts reaching 10.5 kilometres (6.5 mi) in depth. In the north the Kurile island arc connects with the Aleutian Arc at the Kamchatka-Aleutian junction.

=== West Kamchatka orogen ===
The West Kamchatka orogen is a regional geosynclinal complex of the Upper Cretaceous, which is superimposed on a granite-gneiss and schist-basic foundation, and which, after folding, was overlain by Paleogene–Neogene rocks. On the Central and Eastern Kamchatka-Olyutor systems of the Upper Cretaceous is built up a complex of paleogene volcanic-sedimentary strata. During the Late Pliocene – Early Pleistocene in the central zone there developed large basaltic shield volcanoes. The Eastern Zone is characterized by current day volcanism (28 active volcanoes), coinciding with recent graben-like structures.

=== Koryak orogeny ===
The Koryak fold and thrust belt consists of Lower Palaeozoic to Cenozoic terranes, including early Carboniferous metamorphic terranes composed of folds, domes and shear zones with related high-pressure and low-temperature metamorphism. The latest Jurassic to early Cretaceous (early Albian) thrusting was accompanied by dextral strike-slip faulting, and this formed imbricated (overlapping) fans of thrusts and folds with southeast vergence, creating a broken formation and serpentinite mélange. Some of the rocks were metamorphosed to blueschist. These structures are now overlapped by Upper Albian sedimentary rocks with an angular unconformity. A late Cretaceous to Cenozoic deformational event characterized by significant sinistral strike-slip displacement at higher crustal levels resulted in a new set of structures and the rotation of pre-existing structures. The latest Jurassic to early Cretaceous (early Albian) thrusting, and a late Cretaceous to Cenozoic deformational event correspond to assumed proto-Pacific plate motions based on palaeomagnetic data.

=== Sakhalin Cenozoic orogeny ===
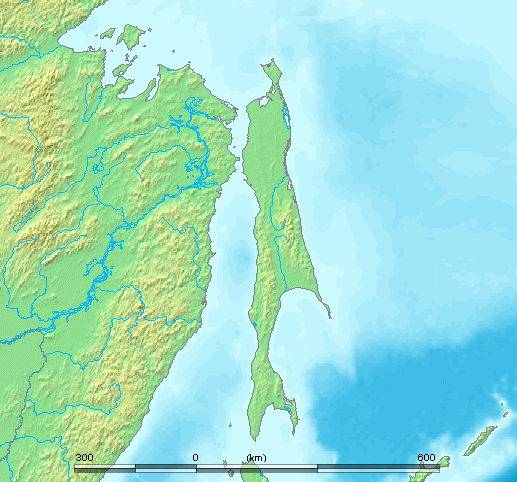
Sakhalin.

The Sakhalin Cenozoic orogeny is divided into East and West zones separated by the Central Sakhalin graben. Oil and gas are associated with the North Sakhalin basin, and there are coal-bearing deposits in mountains associated with the middle Miocene.

== Geology of the Russian Arctic ==
=== Kara terrane ===
Severnaya Zemlya and the northern part of the Taimyr Peninsula formed an independent microcontinent during the Paleozoic, the Kara Terrane or North Kara Terrane. It consists of a Neoproterozoic basement, consisting of metamorphosed sedimentary rocks intruded by granites, which is covered by Upper Neoproterozoic and Paleozoic sedimentary rocks. The North Kara Terrane collided with Siberia around the Devonian-Carboniferous boundary. This collision, which is related to the Caledonian orogeny, is called the Severnaya Zemlya episode.

== See also ==
- Geography of Russia
- Stanovoy Range
- Dzhugdzhur Mountains
- Laptev Sea Rift
- Ulakhan Fault
