= Donets Lowland =

Lowland in Ukraine

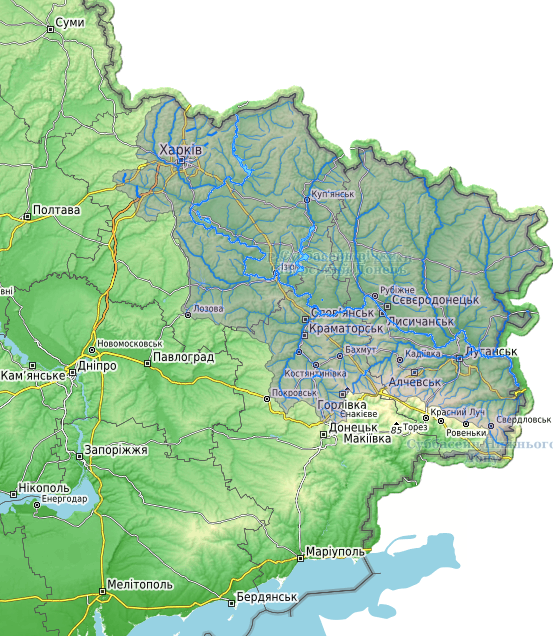
Basin of Siverskyi Donets river in Eastern Ukraine

Donets Lowland (Ukrainian: Донецька низовина) is a narrow lowland spanning along the left bank of Siverskyi Donets and bordering Desna Plateau (part of Central Russian Upland) in the north, Dnieper Lowland in the west and Lower Don lowland in the east. Donets Lowland consists of three terraces, of which the lowest is inundated and covered with numerous oxbow lakes, the middle is a sandy plain covered with dunes and pine forests, and the highest one is covered with loess and dissected into several plateaus by ravines created by the tributaries of Donets river.

== Gallery ==
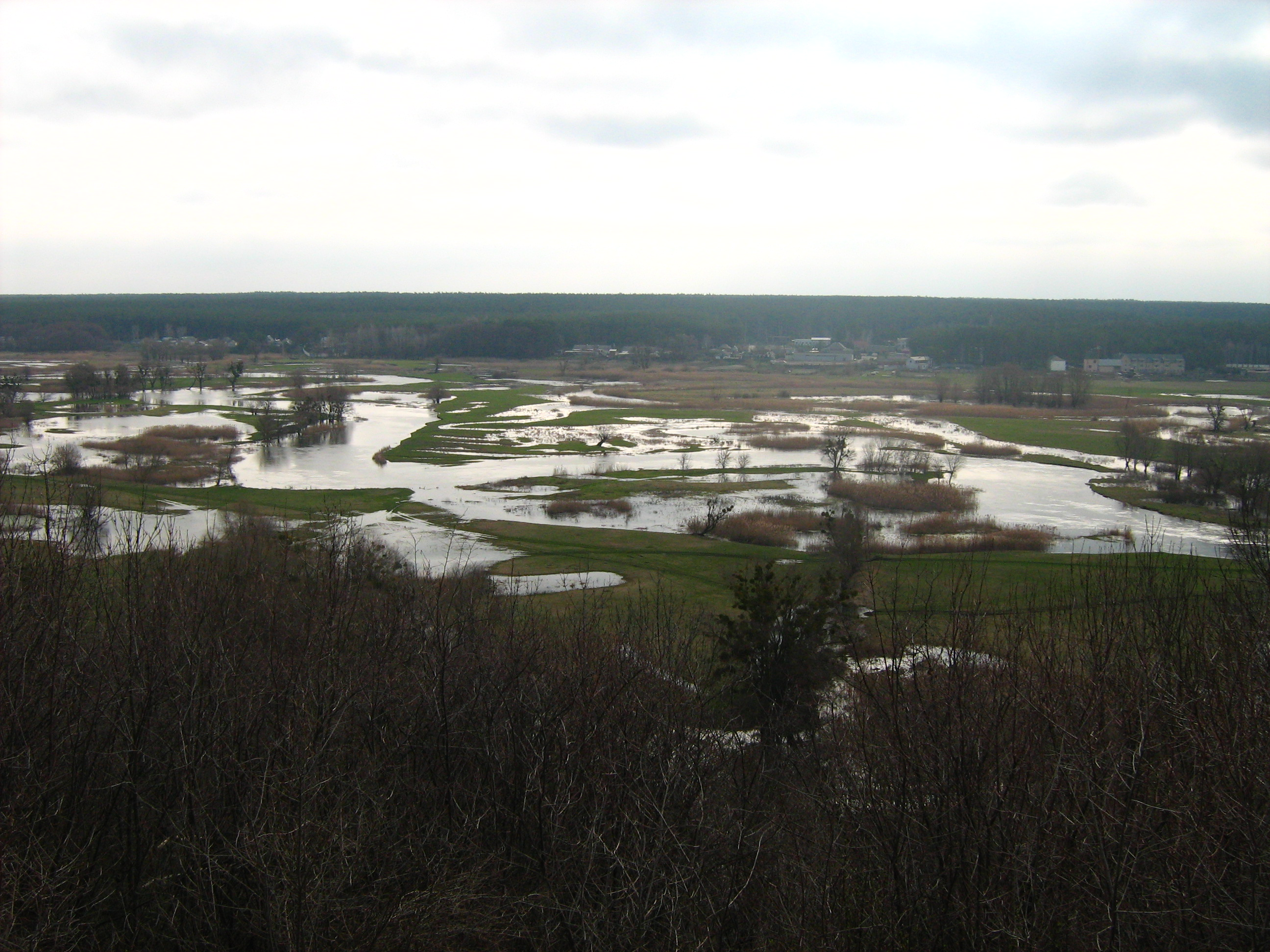
Springtime flooding in the Donets valley near Zmiiv

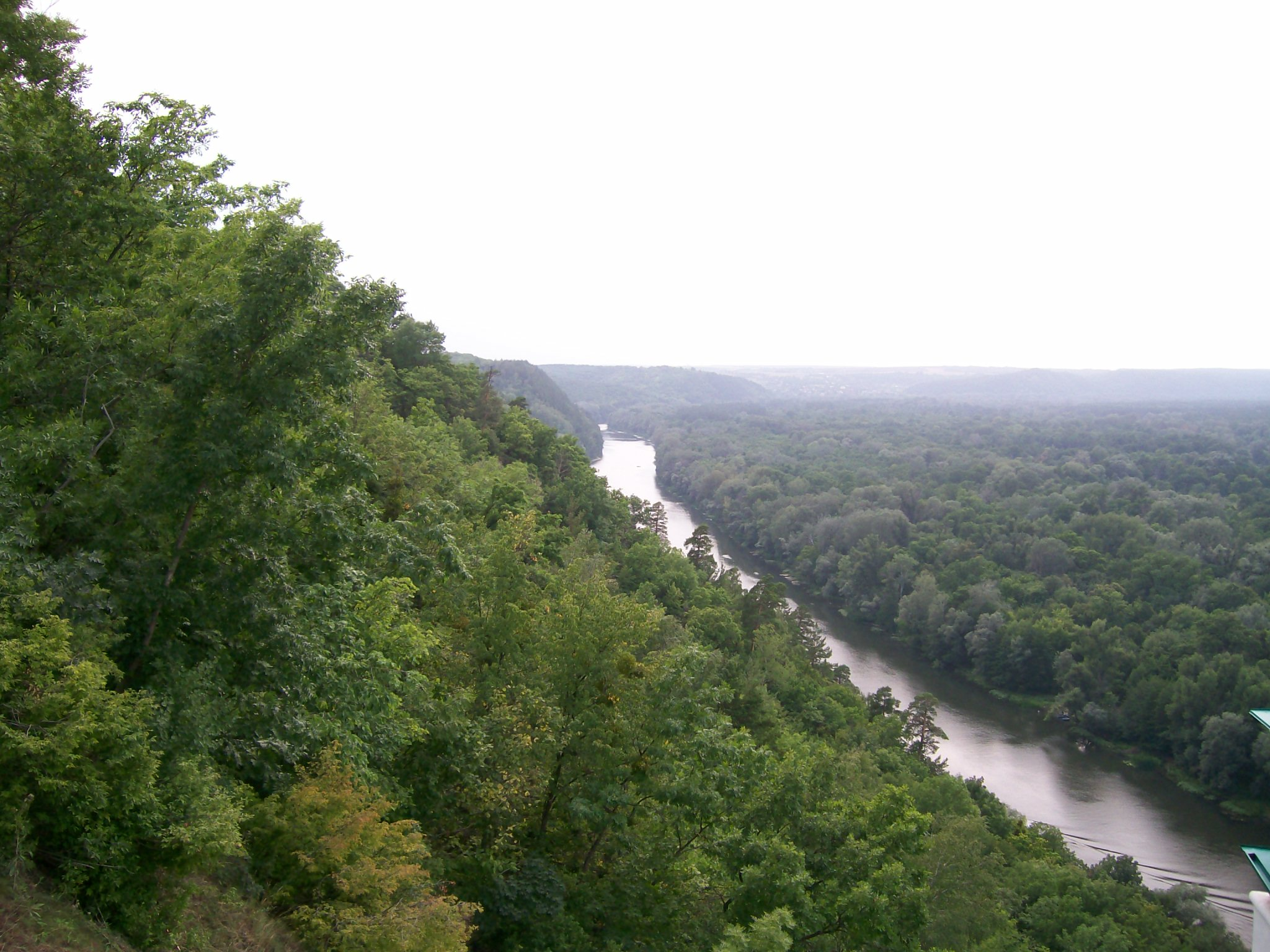
View on the Donets valley in Sviatohirsk

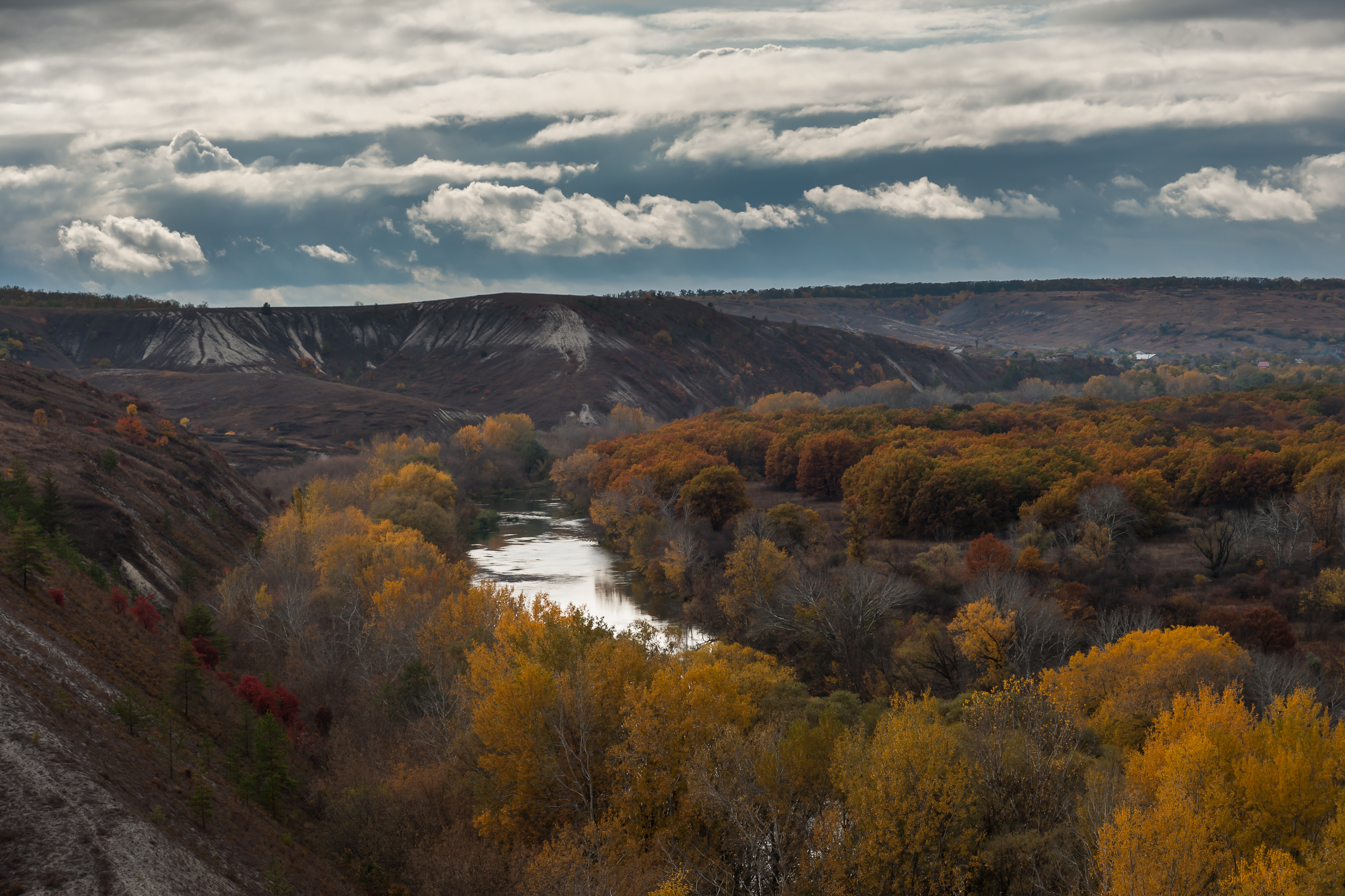
Donets valley near Lyman

== See also ==
- Dnieper-Donets Rift
