= Ilyinets crater =

Impact crater in Ukraine

Coordinates: 49°7′N 29°6′E

- Іллінецький кратер
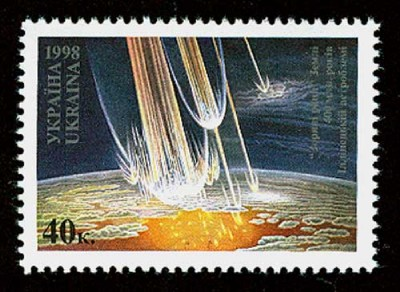
- Ukrainian stamp: "Star wounds" of the Earth. 400 million years Ilyinets astrobleme

- Location within Ukraine
- Location: Ukraine

Impact crater structure
- Confidence: Confirmed
- Diameter: 8.5 kilometres (5.3 mi)
- Age: 378 ± 5 Ma
- Exposed: No
- Drilled: Yes
- Bolide type: Iron?

Ilyinets Ukrainian: Іллінецький кратер, romanized: Illnets'kyy krater is an impact crater in Ukraine (Vinnytsia Oblast).

It is 8.5 kilometres (5.3 mi) in diameter and the age is estimated to be 378 ± 5 million years (Upper Devonian). The crater is not exposed at the surface.

The Ilyinets crater is located at the boundary of Ros–Tikych and Dniester–Bug megastructures of the Ukrainian Shield.
