= Sarmatian Craton =

Part of the East European Craton

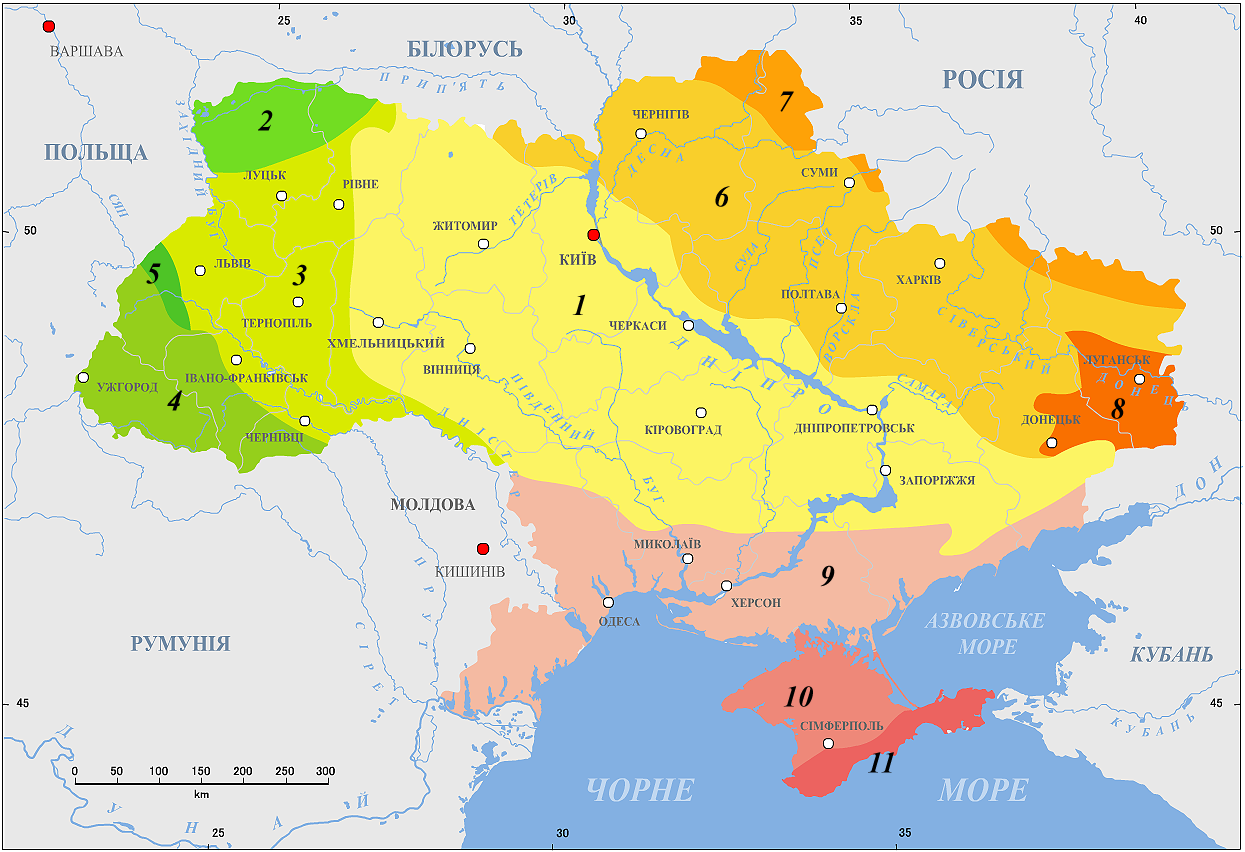
Sarmatian Craton (1=Ukrainian Massif, 7=Voronezh Massif)

The Sarmatian Craton or Sarmatia is the southern segment/region of the East European Craton or Baltica, also known as Scythian Plateau. The craton contains Archaean rocks 2.8 to 3.7 billion years old (Ga). During the Carboniferous the craton was rifted apart by the Dnieper-Donets rift. As a result, geomorphologically the cratonic area is split by the Donbas Fold Belt, also known as a part of the large Pripyat-Dniepr-Donets aulacogen, which transects Sarmatia, dividing it into the Ukrainian Massif or shield on the southwest and the Voronezh Massif to the northeast.

Sarmatia is made up of several once-independent Archaean land masses that formed respectively at 3.7–2.9, 3.6–2.8, 3.2–3.0, and 2.7–2.6 Ga. These are separated by a series of 2.2–2.1 Ga orogenic belts. Sarmatia's northwestern margin has an extensive continental magmatic arc dating back to 2.0–1.95 Ga.

The Ukrainian Shield and Voronezh Massif are the exposed areas of the Sarmatian Craton. The craton can be divided into Archaean (c. 3.7–2.7 Ga) terranes separated by Palaeoproterozoic (c. 2.2–2.1 Ga and 2.0–1.9 Ga) belts.

The Osnitsk-Mikashevichi Belt in the northwest is 150–200 km (93–124 mi)-wide and extends for more than 1,000 km (620 mi) from the Trans-European Suture Zone to Moscow. It is exposed only in the northwest corner of the Ukrainian Shield and in the Pripyat Trough (west of the Devonian Dniepr–Donets Aulacogen). Although mostly hidden beneath Phanerozoic sedimentary rocks the belt can be traced magnetically. The presence of granitic batholiths intruded by diorites and gabbros at c. 1.98–1.95 Ga and hypabbysal and metavolcanic rocks dated to 2.02 Ga indicate the Osnitsk-Mikashevichi Belt formed at an Andes-type active margin along which 2.0–1.95 Ga-old oceanic crust subducted. This subduction was followed by a calm period after which Sarmantia and Fennoscandia collided c. 1.84–1.82 Ga.

The Palaeoproterozoic Volyn Domain is made of 2.06–2.02 Ga-old granitoids emplaced within the 2.2 Ga-old, strongly deformed rocks of the Teterev–Belaya Tserkov belt. The area was strongly deformed at 1.98–1.95 Ga but it can be interpreted as a setting of intense volcanism and sedimentation in a coastal-marine environment in which island arcs reused detritus from Archaean sources. The 1.80–1.74 Ga-old Korosten pluton in northern Ukraine formed from a succession of volcanism. It was originally believed to be an anorogenic process fueled by mantle underplating. More recently, however, it has been demonstrated that the Korosten pluton is not made of mantle-derived igneous material but from the lower crust of the Osnitsk-Mikashevichi Belt extruded in the Central Belarus Suture Zone.

The Podolian Domain in southern Sarmantia is made mostly of Archaean-Palaeoproterozoic granulites (up to 3.7 Ga) and divided by major faults into the Vinnitsa and Gayvoron regions. Archaean charnockite intrusions are common in the southeast. Exposed rocks in western Sarmantia are 10–15 km (6.2–9.3 mi)-thick Archaean to Palaeoproterozoic crust. Granulites in southern Sarmantia were exhumed from a depth of at least 35 km (22 mi). The Golovanevsk Suture Zone in the east contains almost 3.0 Ga-old igneous rocks. The oldest rocks are probably derived from early Archaean oceanic crust.
