= Central Russian Upland =

Upland region of the East European plain

Coordinates: 52°36′N 36°48′E

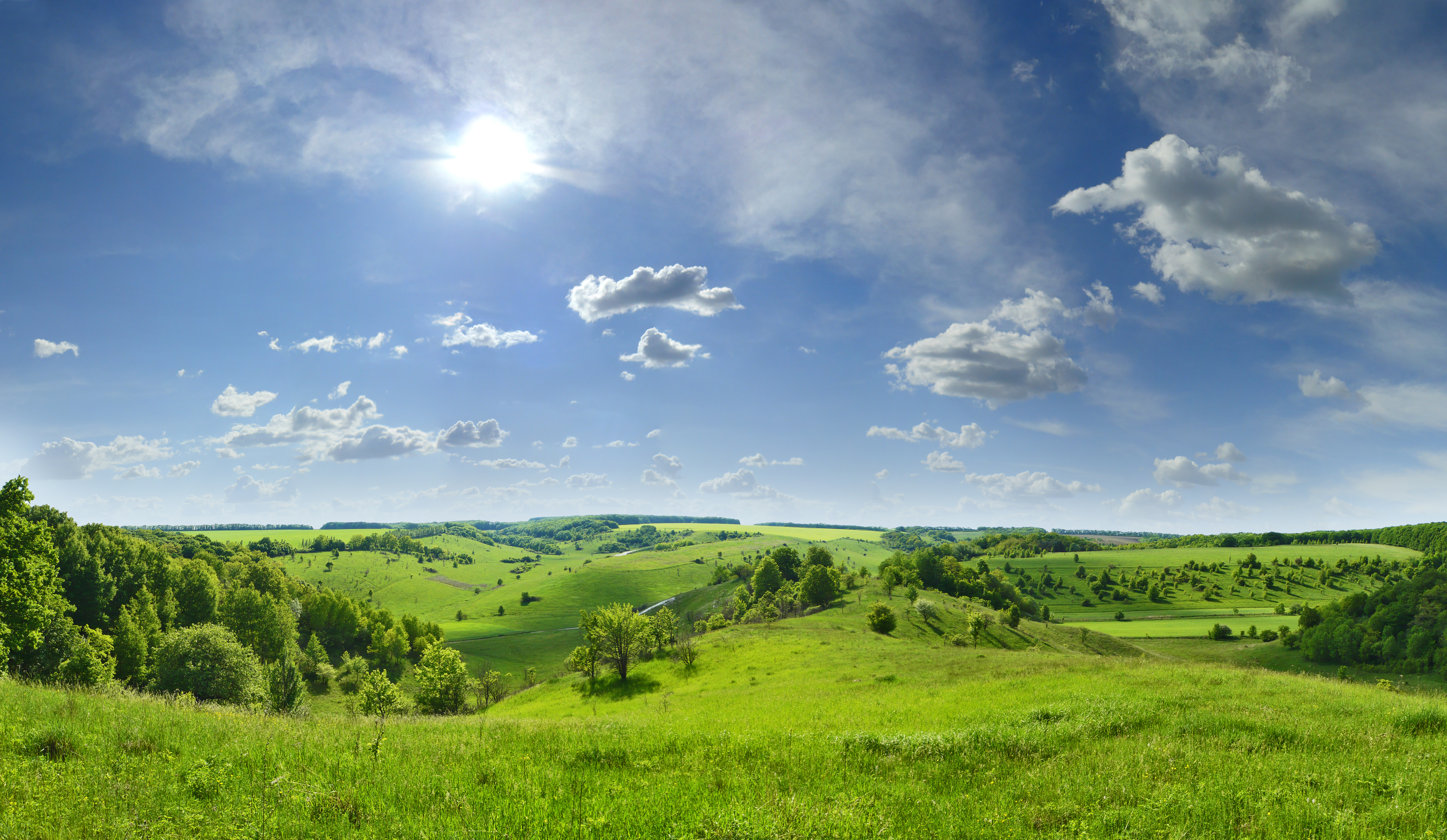
Typical view of the Central Russian Upland (Belgorod Oblast)

The Central Russian Upland (also: Middle Russian Upland (Russian: Среднерусская возвышенность, romanized: Srednerusskaya vozvyshennost') and East European Upland) is an upland area of the East European Plain and is an undulating plateau with an average elevation of 230–250 m (750–820 ft). Its highest peak is measured at 293 m (961 ft). The southeastern portion of the upland is known as the Kalach Upland. The Central Upland is built of Precambrian deposits of the crystalline Voronezh Massif.

== Location ==
It spans approximately 180,000 miles² (480,000 km^{2}) in central and southern European Russia northeast of Ukraine, extending from the Oka river to the Donets river. The upland stretches across a number of regions in Ukraine and the European portion of the Russian Federation. Its north and northwest borders are considered to be the Oka River and an imaginary line Kaluga-Ryazan. To the southeast towards the Donets River, the upland changes into the Donets Lowland. To the east its natural border is defined by the Oka–Don Lowland and to the west there is the Dnieper Lowland. Most of the upland lies within the borders of Russia, hence its name.

== History ==
The Kostroma river and the city of the same name suggest that the area in Central Russia is an important reference point for the original home of the Slavic tribes. The river and city bear the same name as the Slavic goddess Kostroma.

=== Regions ===
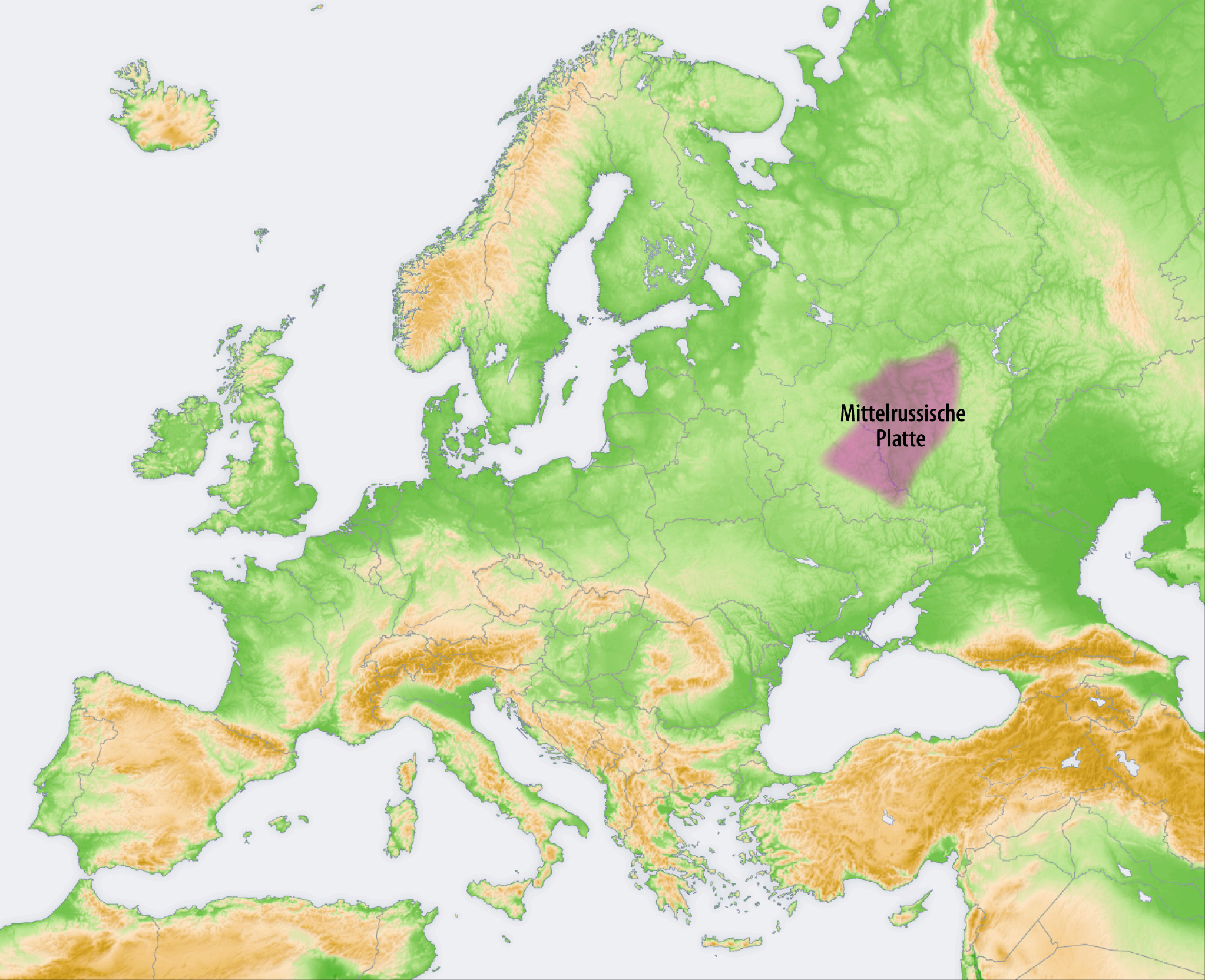
The Upland's position in the European map

- Oryol Oblast
- Bryansk Oblast
- Kursk Oblast
- Belgorod Oblast
- Voronezh Oblast
- Rostov Oblast
- Kharkiv Oblast (Ukraine)
- Sumy Oblast (Ukraine)
- Luhansk Oblast (Ukraine)

== Tectonics ==
The Voronezh Massif is part of the East European Craton and southwesterly descends towards the Dnieper-Donets Through (Depression) which along with Prypiat Through forms the Prypiat-Dniper-Donets aulacogen. Most of the Voronezh Massif is covered with thin layers of sedimentary deposits of the Devonian, Jurassic, Cretaceous, and Paleogene periods. In the southeast along the Don River between the cities of Boguchar and Pavlovsk (both in Voronezh Oblast) the crystalline layers come to the surface. On all sides of the upland the Precambrian deposits descend far below the sedimentary layers. A small part of the upland in the northwest was covered with a glacier during the Wolstonian Stage. Today almost all of the upland is covered with loess and loessial loams.
