= Dnieper-Donets Rift =

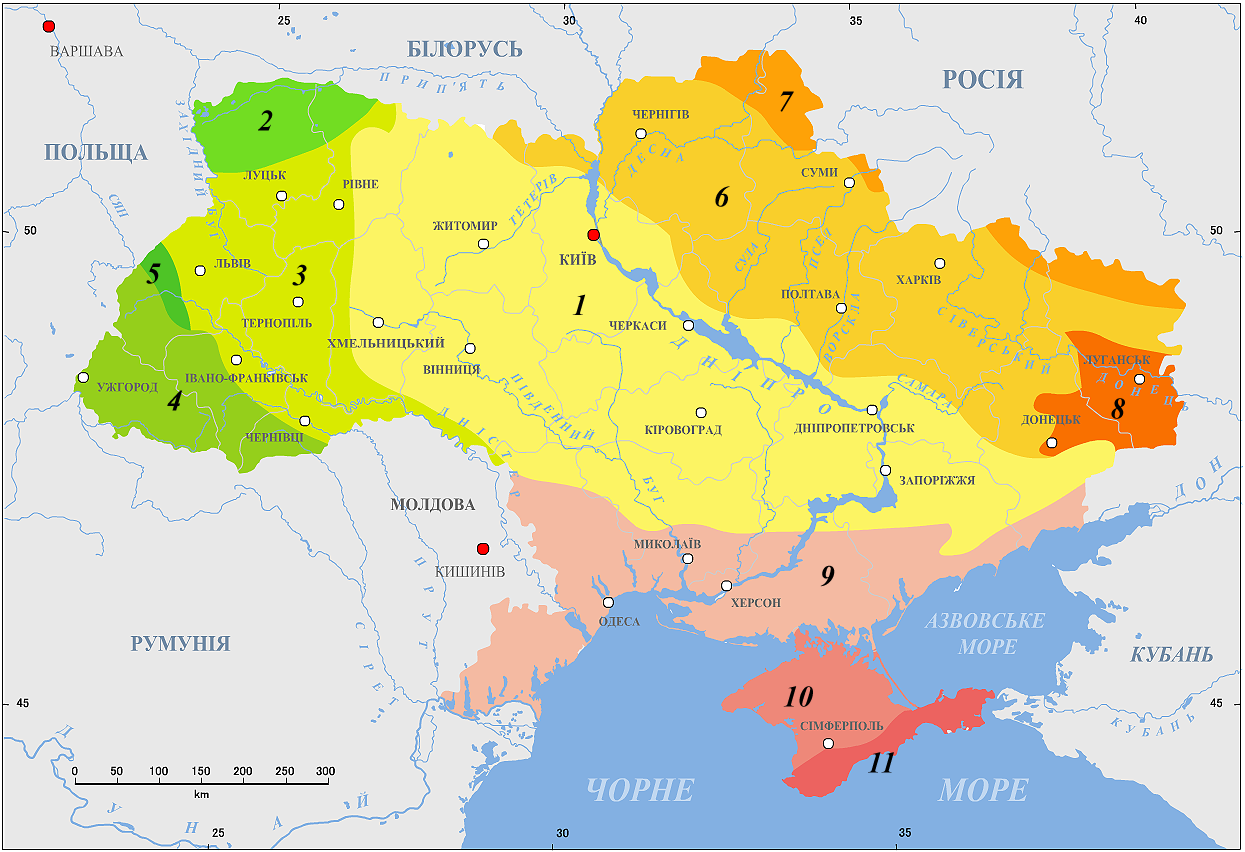
Geological map of Ukraine.: 1. Ukrainian Shield; 6. Dnieper-Donets Rift; 7. Voronezh Massif

The Dnieper-Donets Rift or Pripyat-Dnieper-Donets Rift (also referred as a "paleorift" and "aulacogen") is an east-west running rift in the Sarmatian Craton that developed and was most active in the Paleozoic. The rift extends from the Caspian Depression in Russia to northern Ukraine passing by the Donbas region. The rift separates the Voronezh Massif in the north from the Ukrainian Shield in south.

The Dniepr-Donets Paleorift was the site of Devonian magmatic activity that begun in Late Frasnian and peaked in the Famennian caused by a mantle plume. Extensional tectonics were also most active during the Famennian.

There have been suggestions that the Dniepr-Donets Paleorift is related to the coeval Kola Alkaline Province.
