= Donets Ridge =

Highland in Ukraine and Russia

Coordinates: 48.3333°N 39.0000°E

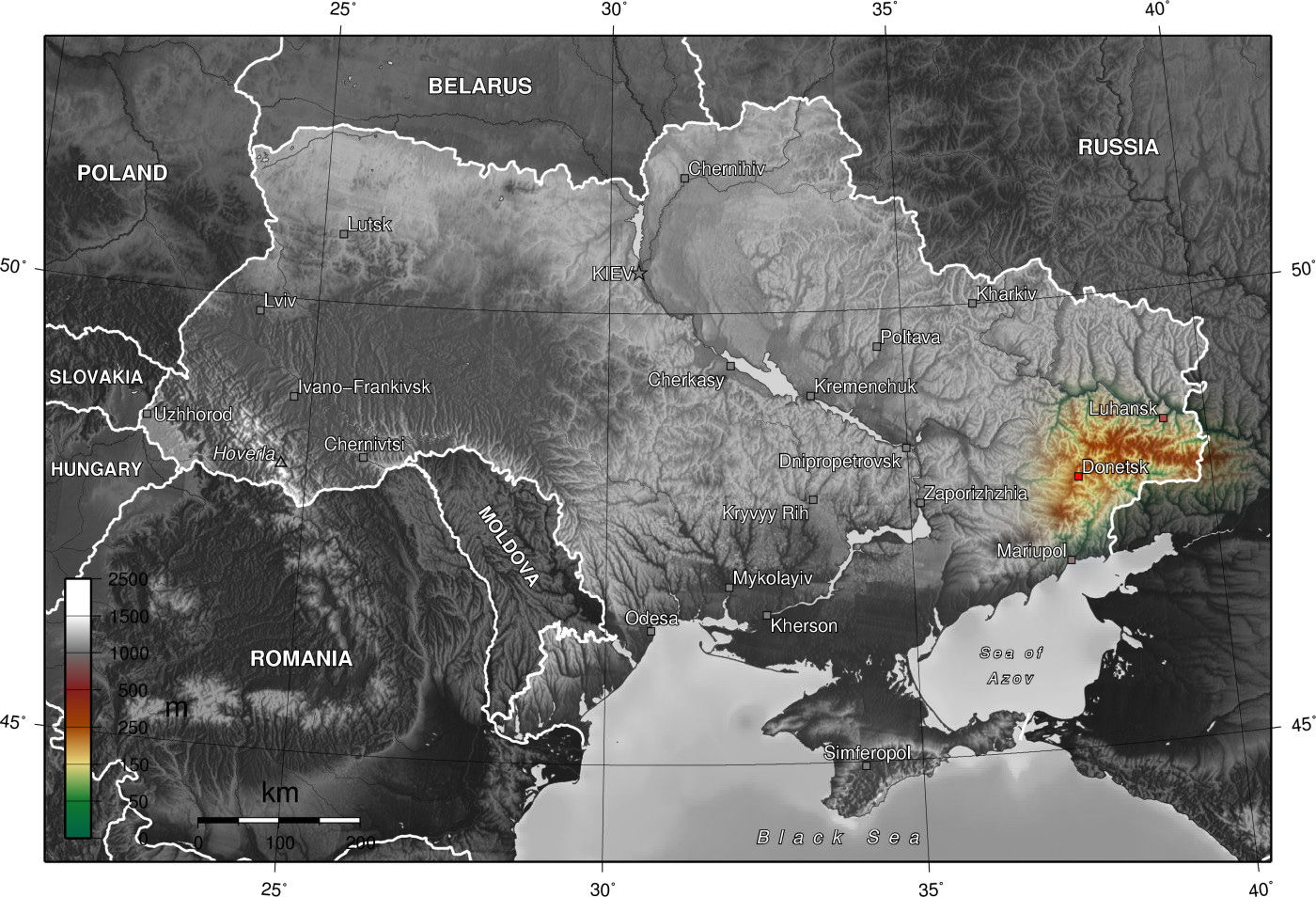
Donets ridge in Ukraine

The Donets Ridge or Donets Upland is a highland located in Ukraine's Donetsk and Luhansk regions, most of which are currently occupied by Russia, as well as in Russia's Rostov Oblast. The highest point on the ridge is the hill Mohyla Mechetna, 367 m (1,204 ft). The Donets Ridge is the easternmost ridge in Ukraine. It is bordered on the north by the valley of the Siverskyi Donets River. It drops in the southeast to the Azov Lowland, and is bordered on the southwest by the Azov Upland.

Another hill, Savur-Mohyla (278 m (912 ft)), was a notable site in the war in Donbas.

== Geology ==
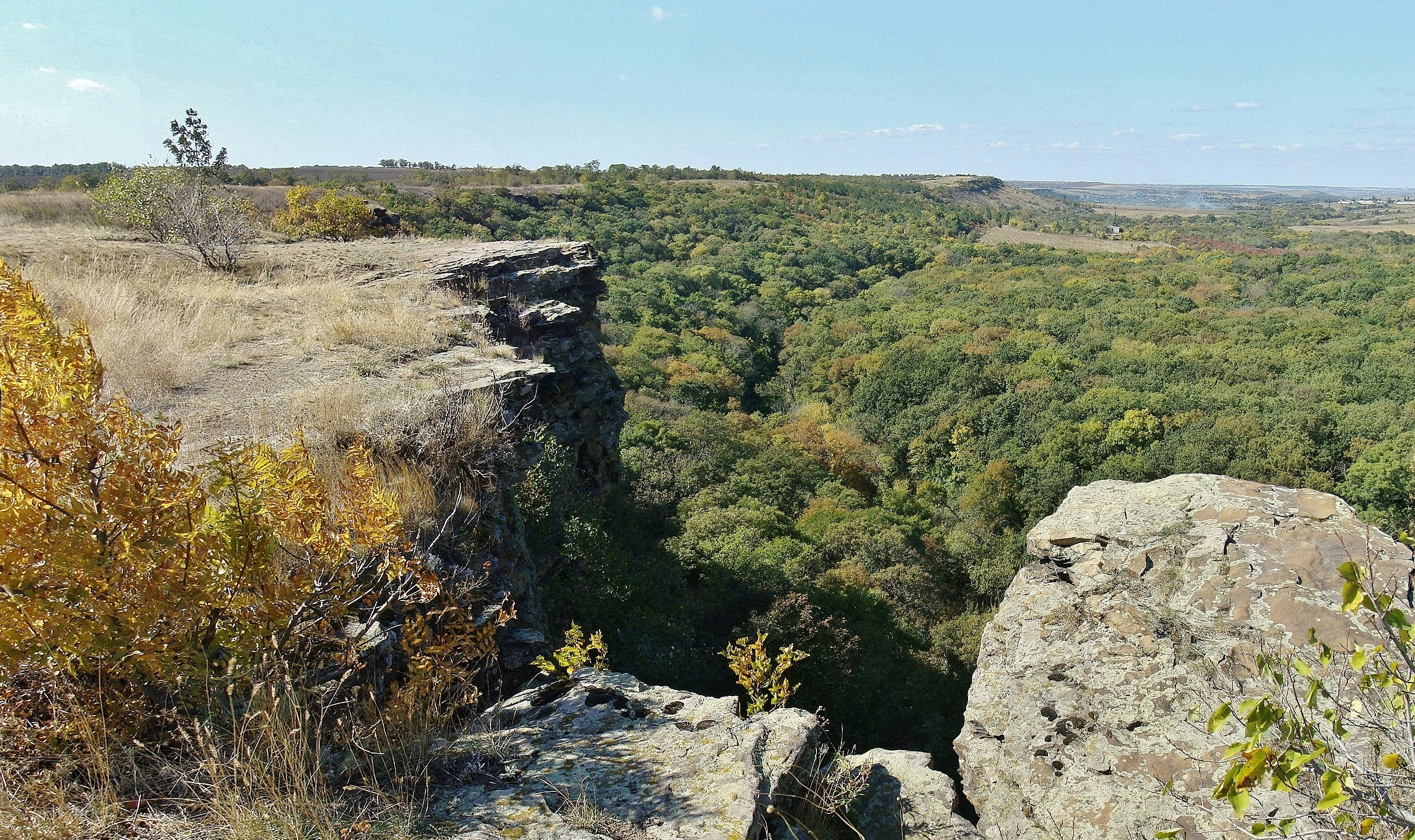
Rock formations on Krynka river

The Donets Ridge is a mountainous formation, that was made in many different phases between the Carboniferous and the Eocene period. During the Hercynian Cycle, between the Upper Permian and the end of the Triassic periods, orogenic movements were at their height. The ridge was destroyed several times due to sea incursions and peneplantation. The last major uplifting of the Donets Ridge occurred during the Upper Pliocene. Since then, the ridge has been subject to erosion.

Most of the Donets Ridge is made of Carboniferous strata. The strata of the Lower Carboniferous period specifically are limestone. On some cliffs in the ridge, the limestone and sandstone strata reach the surface. Since the surface often switched between sea and land, up to 200 substrata were formed. The Donets Ridge also has Permian strata, which contain gypsum and rock salt. Triassic and Jurassic strata are present in the north and northwest of the ridge. The Donets Ridge is almost completely covered in loess.

== Geography ==
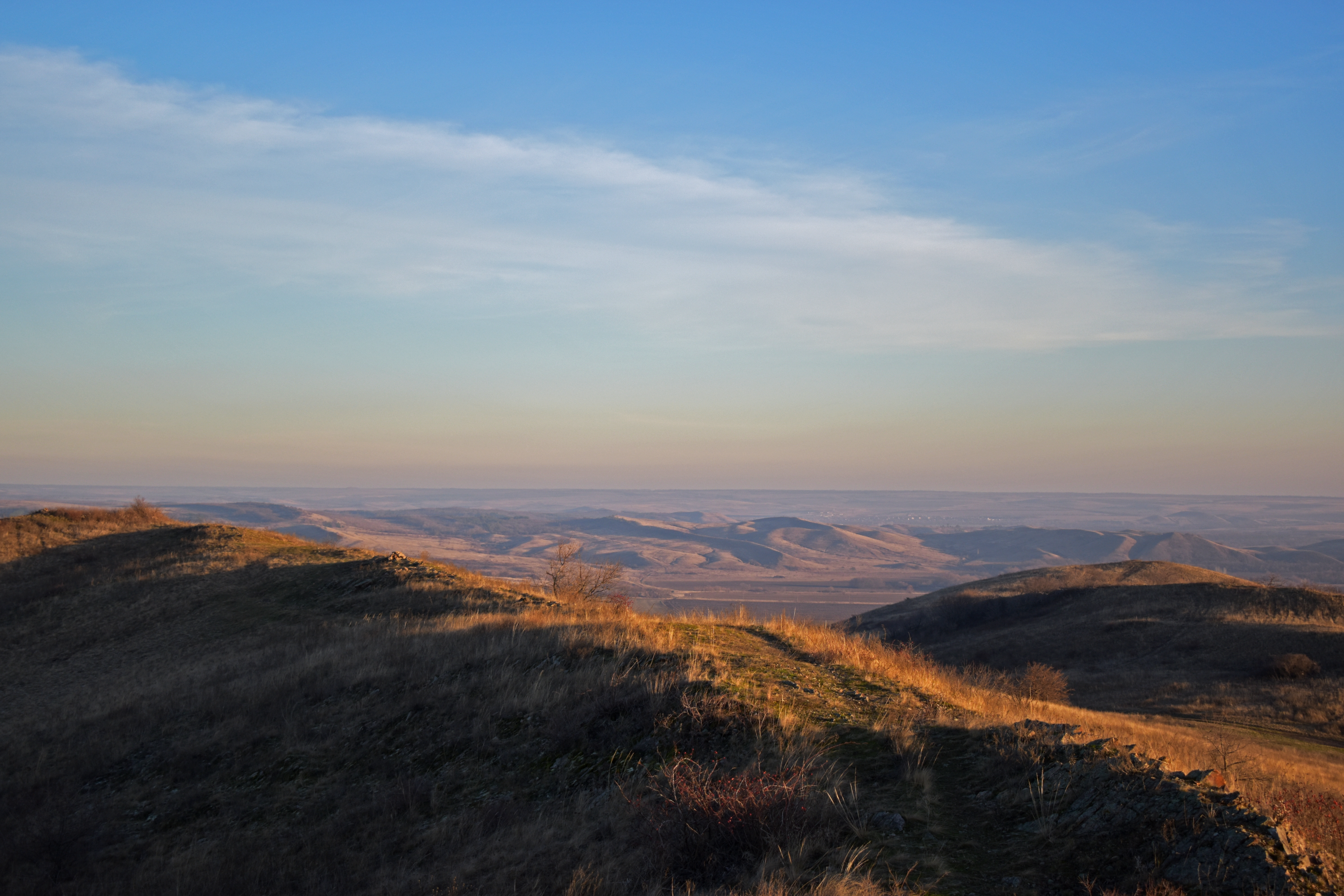
A landscape of Donets Ridge near Blahodatne

The Donets Ridge acts as a drainage divide for the Donets River, which has led to the ridge containing several rivers. Most of the rivers are very shallow, and often dry up in the summer.

Rivers in the Donets Ridge:

- Sukhyi Torets
- Kryvyi Torets
- Bakhmutka
- Luhanka
- Lykha
- Bila Kamianka
- Kundriucha
- Kalmiius
- Miius
- Tuzliv
- Vovcha
- Samara

== Climate ==
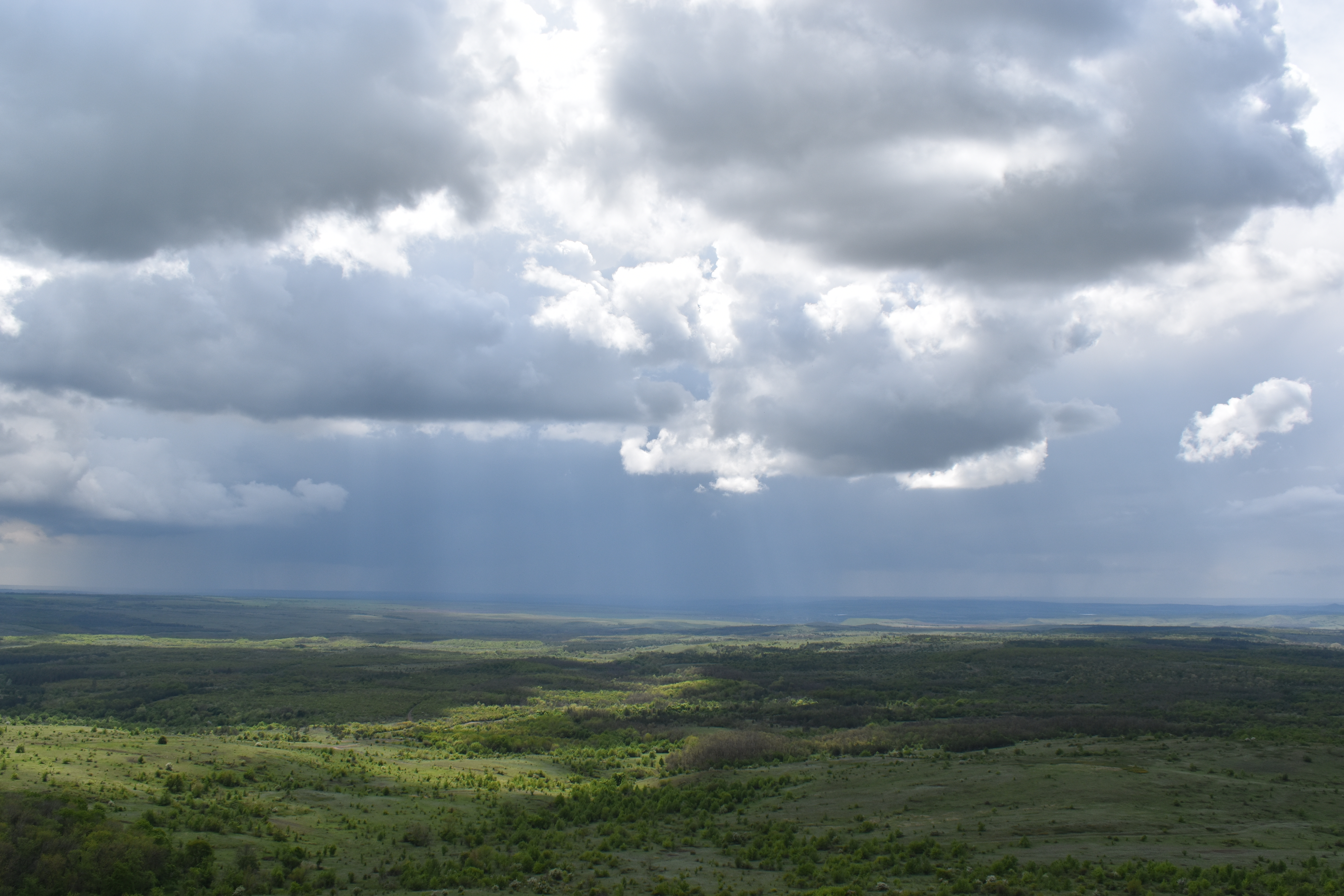
Rain clouds over the Donets Ridge near Savur-Mohyla

The Donets Ridge has a continental climate. During the whole year, the ridge averages around 6.6 to 7.8 degrees Celsius, falling to around -6 to -8 during the winter, and rising to around 21-22 during the summer. The Donets Ridge experiences strong winds, which typically come from the east and southeast. Due to the ridge's high elevation, it gets relatively high precipitation, around 410-500 mm annually. During the summer, dry winds come into the ridge, which damage crops.

== Name ==
The name derives from the river Seversky (Siversky) Donets.
