= Azov Upland =

Plateau in Donetsk and Zaporizhia Oblasts, Ukraine

Coordinates: 47.3315°N 36.5791°E

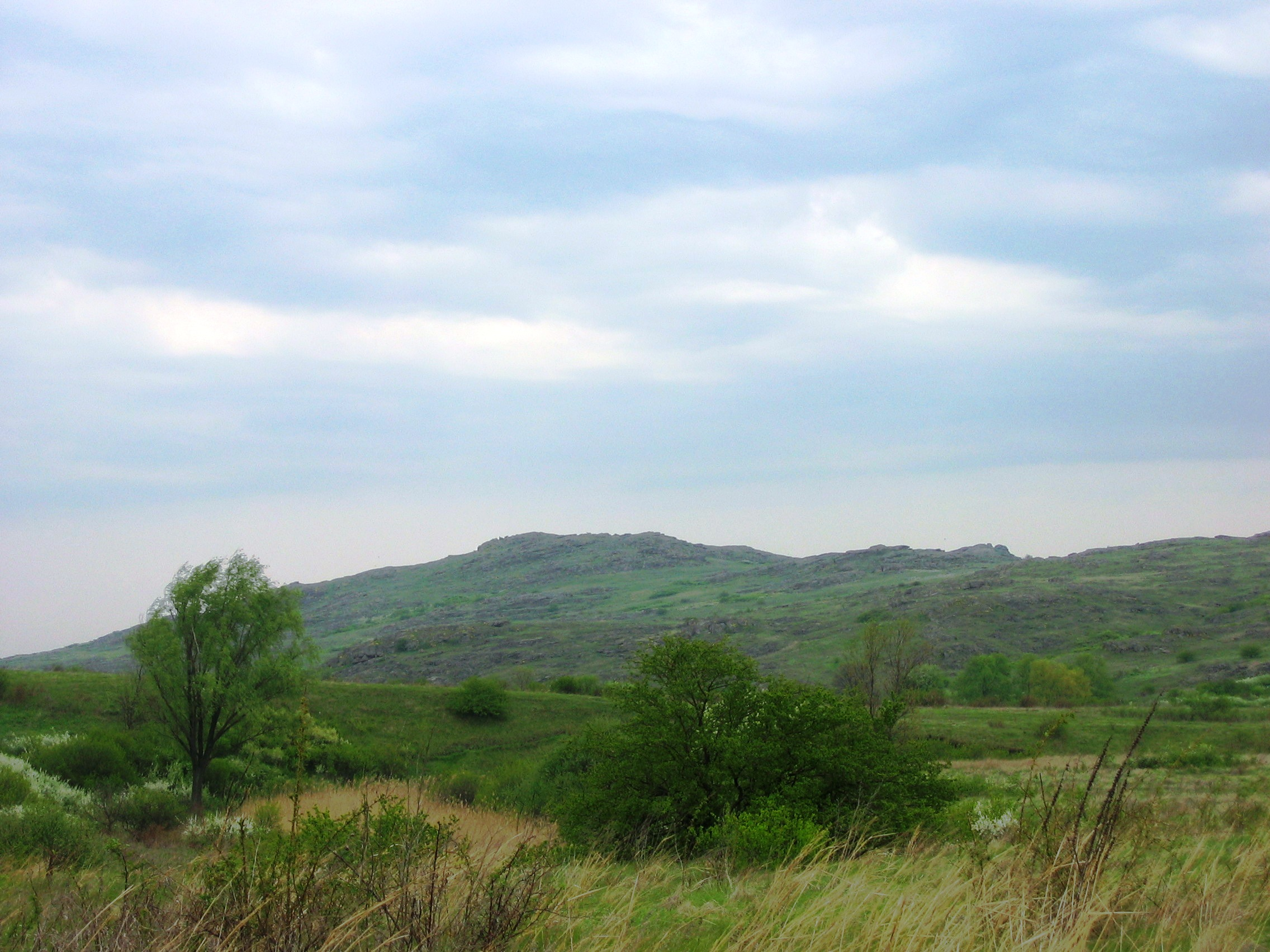
Hill "Kamyana Mohyla"

The Azov Upland is a plateau located in Russian-occupied parts of Donetsk and Zaporizhia oblasts of Ukraine. It is part of the larger Ukrainian Crystalline Shield, also known as the Azov Crystalline Massif. It borders the Dnieper Lowland to the north, the Donets Ridge to the northeast, the Black Sea Lowland to the southwest, and the Azov Lowland to the south. The Azov Upland contains several mounds, known locally as mohyly, which are comparable to the Russian kurgan. The tallest of these mounds is Mount Belmak-Mohyla, with a height of 327 m (1,073 ft). The elevation of the Azov Upland varies between 200 and 250 m (660 and 820 ft).

The climate is similar to Donets Ridge. Soils are categorized as chernozem of poor or medium humus. Vegetation is a fescue-feather-grass steppe.
