= Volgo–Uralia =

Volgo–Uralia is a crustal segment that, together with the Sarmatian Craton and the Fennoscandian Craton, makes up the East European Craton. Volgo–Uralia is the easternmost of the three segments and borders the Sarmatian Craton to the southwest along the Pachelma aulacogen and the Fennoscandian Craton to the northwest along the Volhyn–Central Russian aulacogen.
