= East European Craton =

Geology of Europe

The East European Craton (EEC) is the core of the Baltica proto-plate and consists of three crustal regions/segments: Fennoscandia to the northwest, Volgo-Uralia to the east, and Sarmatia to the south. Fennoscandia includes the Baltic Shield (also referred to as the Fennoscandian Shield) and has a diversified accretionary Archaean and early Proterozoic crust, while Sarmatia has an older Archaean crust. The Volgo-Uralia region has a thick sedimentary cover, however deep drillings have revealed mostly Archaean crust. There are two shields in the East European Craton: the Baltic/Fennoscandian shield and the Ukrainian shield. The Ukrainian Shield and the Voronezh Massif consists of 3.2-3.8 Ga Archaean crust in the southwest and east, and 2.3-2.1 Ga Early Proterozoic orogenic belts.

The Ural Mountains are the eastern margin of the East European Craton and mark the Late Paleozoic orogenic collision of the East European Craton with the Siberian cratons. The southern margin of the craton is where Sarmatia is buried beneath thick Phanerozoic sediments and the Alpine orogens. The intervening Late Palaeozoic Donbas Fold Belt, also known as part of the Dnieper-Donets Rift, transects Sarmatia, dividing it into the Ukrainian Shield and the Voronezh Massif. The southwestern boundary is known as the Trans European Suture Zone and separates the East European craton from the Phanerozoic orogens of Western Europe (e.g. Carpathians). The northwestern margin of the craton is overlaid by the fold-and-thrust Early Paleozoic Caledonian orogen.

== Platform basement ==
The most distinguishable physiographic aspect of the East European Craton is the extensive 3-km and more-thick Riphean (middle to late Proterozoic) sedimentary cover over its 3000-km-wide platform area (East European Platform, EEP, also known as the Russian Platform). This is in sharp contrast to the exposed northwest portion of the Baltic Shield, and the Ukrainian Shield in the southwest. The lithospheric thickness also varies widely from 150–200 km in Ukraine to 120 km in southern Russia to over 250 km thick in the NE Baltic Shield, with extremely wide thickness fluctuations of the crustal layers. A shield in any craton is the area of exposed crystalline crust while the other part of the craton is the “platform” where the crystalline crust or basement is overlaid by younger sedimentary cover. Thus the crustal segments of the East European Craton comprise both the Baltic Shield and the Ukrainian Shield, and the sedimentary platform basement.

== Early tectonics ==
The East European Craton has a very complex tectonic history with extensive Proterozoic and Paleozoic rifting, a large portion of which is of early deep mantle plume origin.
