= Anorogenic magmatism =

Geologic mechanism

In geology, anorogenic magmatism is the formation, intrusion or eruption of magmas not directly connected with orogeny (mountain building). Anorogenic magmatism occurs, for example, at mid-ocean ridges, hotspots and continental rifts. This contrasts with orogenic magmatism that occurs at convergent plate boundaries where continental collision, subduction and orogeny are common.
