= Voronezh Massif =

Voronezh Massif (also Voronezh Anteclise Russian: Воронежская антеклиза, or Voronezh Uplift) is a tectonic anteclise in the south of the Central Russian Upland with a high occurrence of the Precambrian basement. It lies to the southwest of the town of Voronezh, Russia.

The massif covers the southwest area of European Russia. Ukraine lies to the southwest, while Belarus is to the west. The massif is bordered northwest of the Orsha depression and Zhlobin saddle, south-west and south of the Pripyat-Donetsk aulacogens, east of the Caspian Basin, and northeast of the Moscow Basin. The Voronezh Massif stretches 800 kilometres (500 mi) from northwest to southeast, and between 300–400 kilometres (190–250 mi) wide.

The basement rocks usually occur at a depth of 40–250 metres (130–820 ft), sometimes coming to the surface of the Earth. The north-eastern and eastern slopes are gently sloping, while the southern slope is steeper.

Two megablocks are distinguished in the structure of the Precambrian basement of the VCM: the eastern (Voronezh), composed of Lower Proterozoic 6 formations, and the western (Kursk), characterized by the predominant distribution of Archean rocks, among which Lower Proterozoic deposits are observed only in narrow linear zones of the southeast – northwest strike.

in the east, the platform is covered by sedimentary rocks of the Riphean and Vendian periods. The southern portion consists of Devonian, Permian and Triassic cover, with some other Mesozoic and Cenozoic rocks. The Voronezh anteclise formed mainly in the Hercynian orogeny. The Voronezh anteclise contains iron ore of the Kursk Magnetic Anomaly.

== See also ==
- Geology of Russia
- East European Craton
