= Ukrainian Shield =

The southwest shield of the East European craton

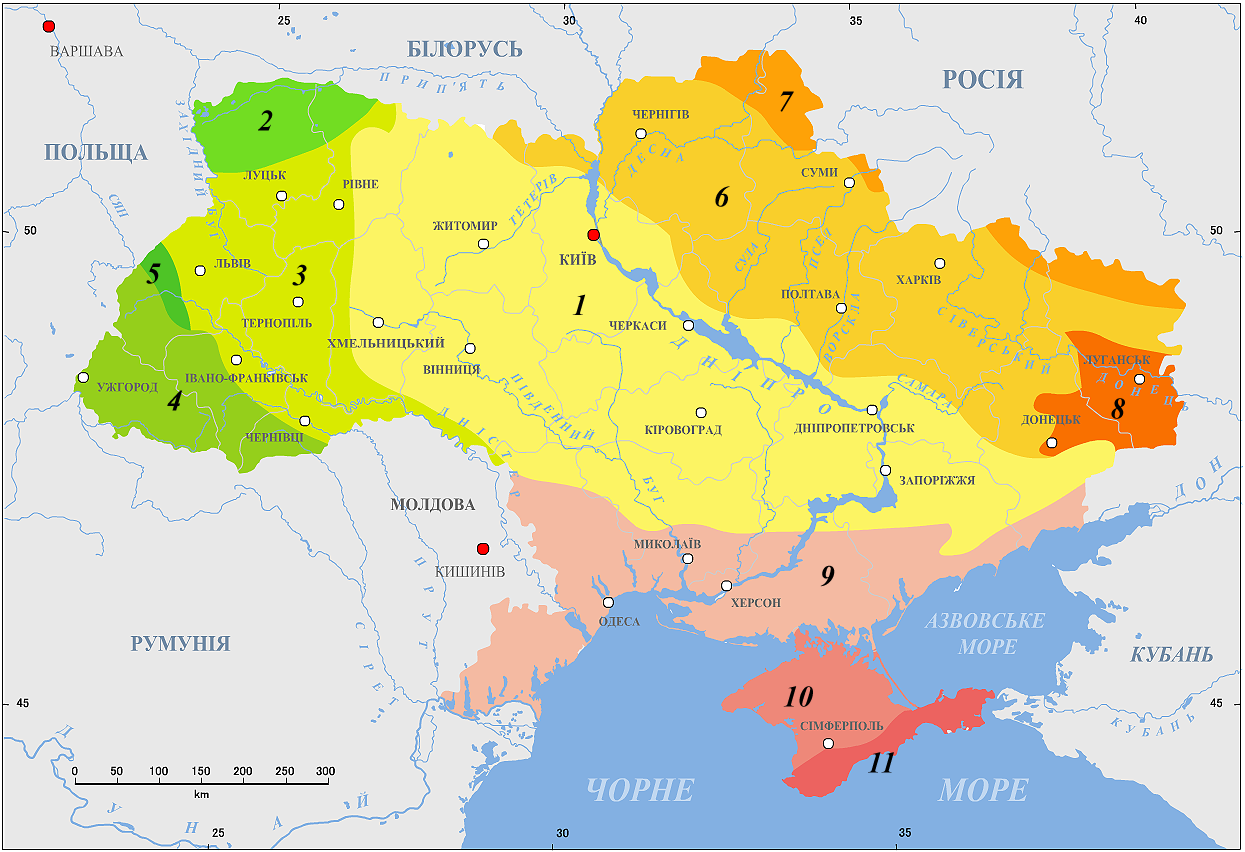
1. Ukrainian Shield

In geology, the Ukrainian Shield (Ukrainian: Український щит, romanized: Ukrayinsʹkyy shchyt) or the Ukrainian Crystalline Massif (Ukrainian: Український кристалічний масив, romanized: Ukrayinsʹkyy krystalichnyy masyv) is the southwest shield of the East European craton. It has an area of about 200,000 km^{2} (77,000 sq mi) and is approximately 1,000 km (620 mi) long and up to 250 km (160 mi) wide.

It is a pegmatite geologic province which can be divided into the following megastructures: Middle Prydniprovia, Western Pryazovia, Eastern Pryazovia, Ingulski, Rosynsko-Tikychki, Dnistersko-Buzki and Volyn, which differ in mineralogical composition and geochemical specialization.

The Ukrainian Shield and the Voronezh Massif consist of 3.2-3.8 Ga Archean crust in the southwest and east, and 2.3-2.1 Ga Early Proterozoic orogenic belts.

The Ilyinets crater is located at the boundary of Rosynsko-Tikychki, Dnistersko-Buzki.
