= Main Uralian Fault =

The Main Uralian Fault (MUF) is a fault that runs north–south through the middle of the Ural Mountains for over 2,000 km. It separates both Europe from Asia and the three, or four, western megazones of the Urals from the three eastern megazones: namely the Pre-Uralian Foredeep, West Uralian, and the Central Uralian to the west, and the Tagil-Magnitogorskian, East Uralian, and Transuralian to the east. The Russian Plate is often included as the fourth megazone to the west. On the west side of the fault the rocks represent the sediments of the eastern continental margin zone of the European Plate (Baltica). On the east the rocks are accreted oceanic and island arc basalts, ultramafics and volcanics as well as the sediments of the western continental margin zones of the Siberian craton (Angara Plate) on the north and the Kazakhstan craton on the south.

== Formation ==
The Main Uralian Fault formed in the Riphean (early Neoproterozoic) in the breakup of the supercontinent Rodinia as a rift valley between the Baltica and the Angara Plate (Siberian craton). As these two plates pulled apart eventually a mid-ocean ridge formed. The ridge was of basic (basalt) and ultramafic material. Some 500 million years later, in the Silurian, a subduction zone formed on the western margin of the Angara Plate, which at the time was on the western edge of Gondwana, and the oceanic plate was subducted underneath the Angara Plate, accreting some of the basalts and ultramafics onto the Angara Plate. Sialic sediments were metamorphosed, melted and intruded into the rocks above as granites. By the early Carboniferous the oceanic plates were completed subducted and the eastern margin of Baltica, then on the eastern edge of Laurussia began to collide with the western edge of Angara. In the south the western edge of Kazakhstania may have been pushed under Baltica. This collision in known generally as the Variscan orogeny, and specifically as to the Urals as the Uralian orogeny The collision lasted nearly 90 million years from the Carboniferous to the early Triassic. The MUF remained active as the plates ground against each other as Pangea was formed and the Ural Mountains were raised up.

== Dip ==
There is seismic evidence that the Main Uralian Fault extends very deep, in excess of 15 kilometres (9.3 mi), into the crust and dips to the east as a result of the subduction zone that formed in the Silurian along the western margin of the Siberian craton. This is supported by evidence of a north–south magmatic axis in the southern Urals that runs through the East Uralian megazone.
