= Uralian orogeny =

Geological events that formed the Ural Mountains

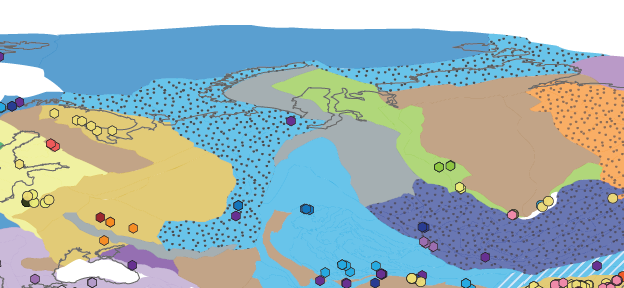
Map of the Uralian orogeny (blue with black dots)

The Uralian orogeny is the long series of linear deformation and mountain building events that raised the Ural Mountains, starting in the Late Carboniferous and Permian periods of the Palaeozoic Era, c. 323–299 and 299–251 million years ago (Mya) respectively, and ending with the last series of continental collisions in Triassic to early Jurassic times.

The region affected by the orogeny, the Uralian orogenic belt or the Uralides, is usually thought of as the boundary between Europe and Asia. It extends from the Aral Sea to Novaya Zemlya, and it includes in addition to the Ural Mountains, the Pay-Khoy Ridge of northwest Russia and the Mugodzhar Hills of northwest Kazakhstan. Its total length is about 3,500 kilometres (2,200 mi), of which the Ural Mountains are about 2,500 km (1,600 mi).

At the latitude of the Middle-Urals Ring Structure (c. 56° N, between Perm and Ufa) the Ural Mountains have an eastward-convex bend. It has been proposed that the Precambrian Middle-Urals Ring Structure caused a disturbance in the orogeny leading to the formation the bend.

== Formation ==
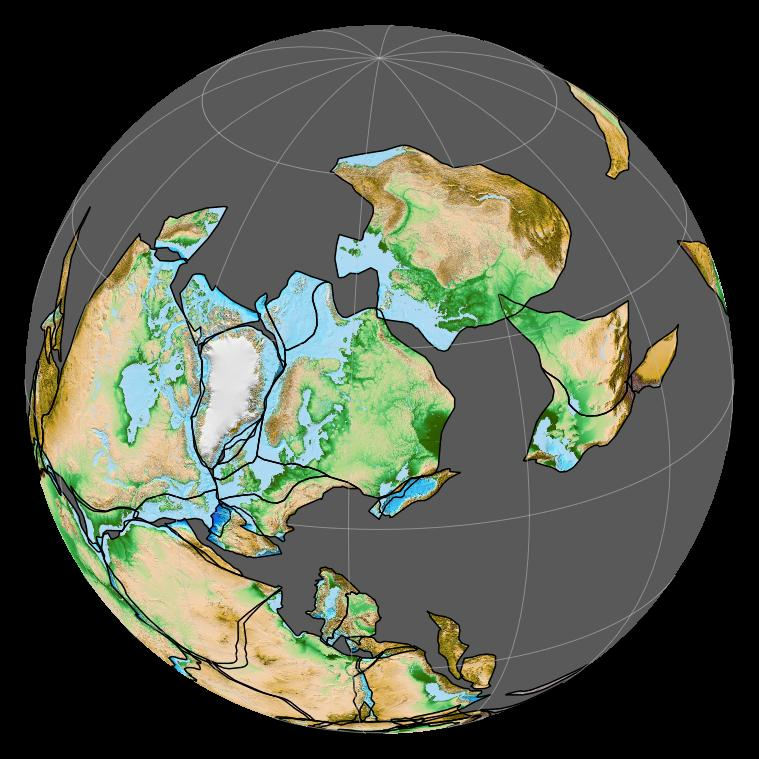
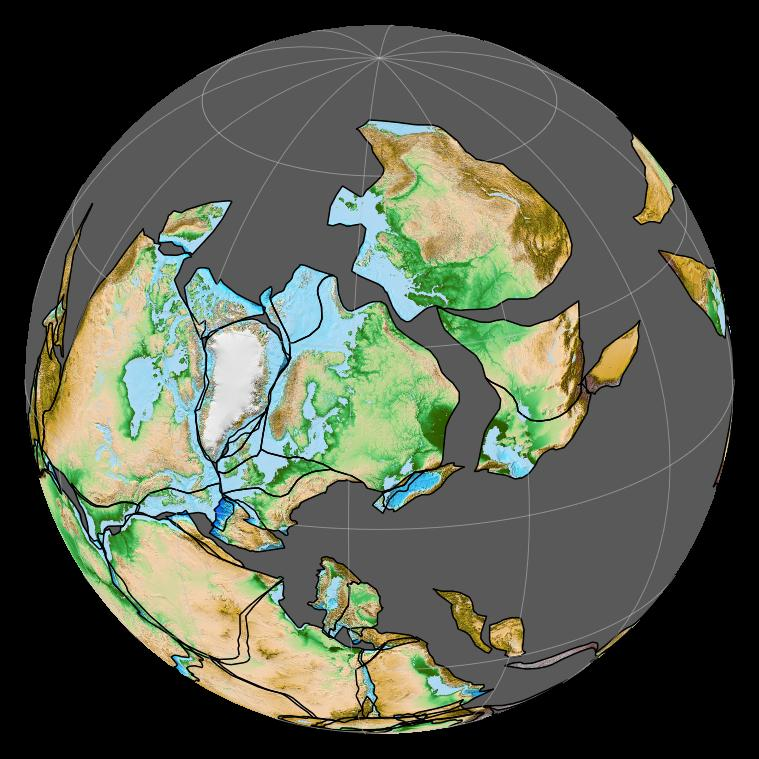
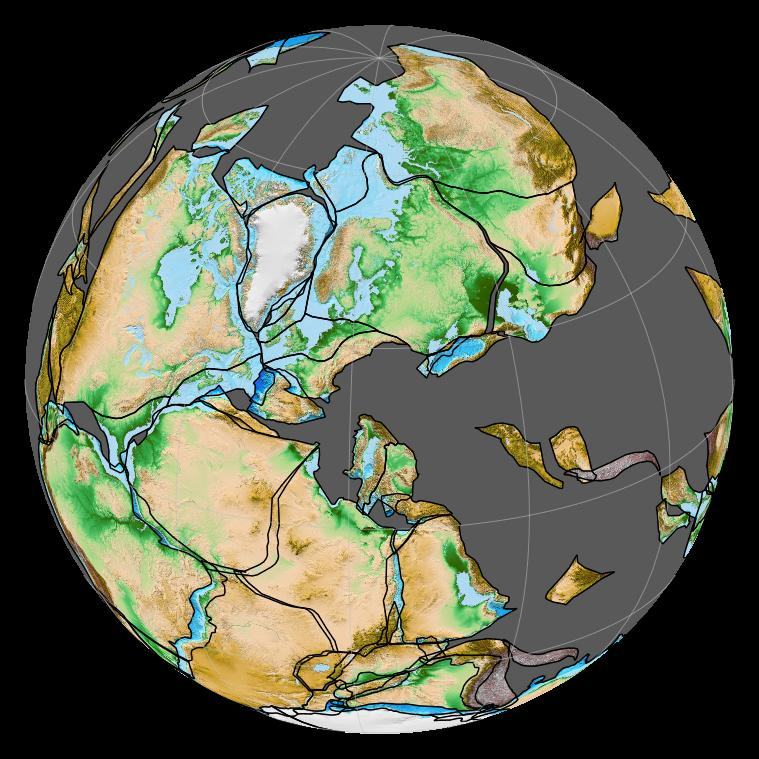
The Uralian orogeny and the formation of Laurasia during the late Carboniferous (300 Mya), early Permian (280 Mya), and Middle Triassic (240 Mya);
View centred on 25°N,35°E

The Uralian orogen (sensu stricto) occurred between three Palaeozoic continents, Baltica, Kazakhstania, and Siberia. In the late Precambrian, the northeast margin of Baltica was deformed in the Timanide and Cadomide orogenies or the assembly of the Pannotia supercontinent. The break-up of this supercontinent opened the Palaeo-Uralian Ocean, in which a number of unidentified continental fragments rifted from Baltica. As Baltica collided with Laurentia to form Laurussia, island arcs and other microcontinents were accreted to Baltica in the Late Devonian-Early Carboniferous.

In the Ordovician-Silurian, Kazakhstania formed separately when subduction-driven growth accreted crust to a series of small, late Precambrian microcontinents. In the early Late Carboniferous, Kazakhstania began to collide with Laurussia as the Palaeo-Uralian ocean subducted beneath the margins of the latter.

The northern continuation of the Ural Mountains, the Pay-Khoy-Novaya Zemlya foldbelt, is the result of the collision between Laurussia and Siberia in the Early Jurassic.

The southern continuation of the Ural Mountains, the southern Tian-Shan mountains, formed in the late Palaeozoic with the closure of the Turkestanian Ocean, an Ordovician-Carboniferous southern branch of the Palaeo-Uralian Ocean. Tian-Shan remained a stable platform until the Alpine-Himalayan orogeny in the Pliocene-Quaternary.

== See also ==
- Main Uralian Fault
