= Baikalides =

Baikalides or Baikalide Orogen may refer to:

- Central Asian Orogenic Belt
- Timanide Orogen
