= Central Asian Orogenic Belt =

Phanerozoic accretionary orogen

The Central Asian Orogenic Belt (CAOB), also called the Altaids, is one of the world's largest Phanerozoic accretionary orogens, and thus a leading laboratory of geologically recent crustal growth. The orogenic belt is bounded by the East European Craton and the North China Craton in the Northwest-Southeast direction, as well as Siberia Craton and Tarim Craton in the Northeast-Southwest direction. It formed by ocean closures during Neoproterozoic to the late Phanerozoic time, from around 750 to 150 Ma. Like many other accretionary orogenic belts, the Central Asian Orogenic Belt consists of a huge amount of magmatic arcs, arc-related basins, accretionary complexes, seamounts, continental fragments and ophiolites. It is also considered a relatively distinctive collisional orogenic belt because widespread subduction-accretion complexes and arc magmatic rocks can be found in the region, but collision-related foreland basins are not common.

The formation history of the Central Asian Orogenic Belt is complex and highly disputed among academic scientists. Currently, there are two major evolutionary hypotheses that could potentially explain the geological history of the Central Asian Orogenic Belt. One of the hypothesis stated by geologist Celal Sengor proposed that the Central Asian Orogenic Belt formed due to the accretion of multiple oceanic arcs and continental crusts, while another hypothesis proposed that it was produced by accumulating subduction-accretion complexes on a magmatic arc.

The Central Asian Orogenic Belt is one of the most researched orogenic belts in the world due to its high significance in researching continental accretion and ore formation. It contains many natural resources, including mineral ores, oil and gas. These rich mineral resources explain why the Central Asian Orogenic Belt is also called the Central Asian metallogenic domain, which is one of the largest metallogenic domains in the world.

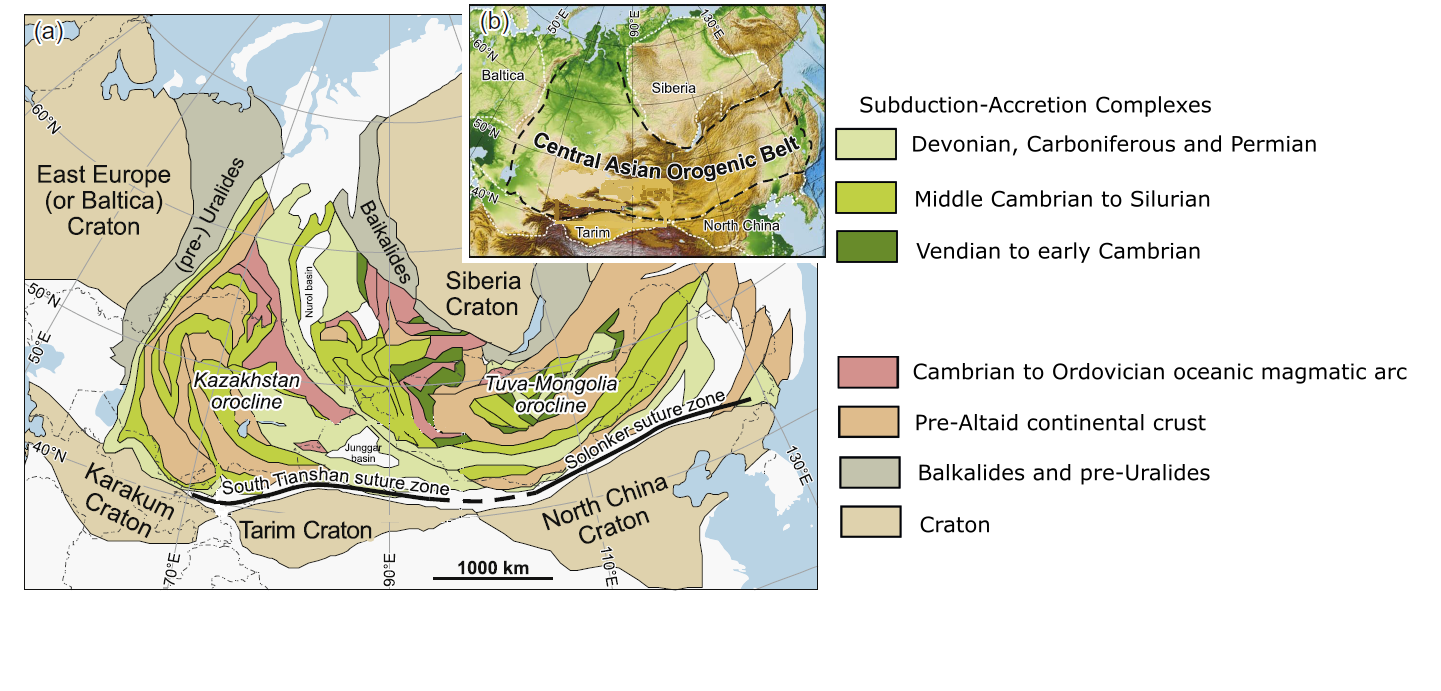
Figure 1 Location map of the CAOB. Adapted from Han and Zhau 2017. The map shows that the Central Asian Orogenic Belt is located at the northern portion of Asia, and can be divided into two major parts, which are Kazakhstan orocline and Tuva-Mongolia orocline. It is bounded by the East Europe Craton, Siberia Craton, Karakum Craton, Tarim Craton, and North China Craton. The Central Asian Orogenic Belt is made up of the fragments of continental crust, magmatic arc, and subduction-accretion complexes, which are defined as the sediments or oceanic crust added to a continental crust at a subduction zone.

== Location ==
Like any typical accretionary orogen, the Central Asian Orogenic Belt is long and wide. It occupies roughly 30% of the land surface area of the entire Asia. It is located within the boundary of six nations, which are China, Kazakhstan, Kyrgyzstan, Mongolia, Russia, and Uzbekistan. The Central Asian Orogenic Belt is located between the East European craton and North China craton on the Northwest-Southeast direction, and between Siberian craton and Tarim craton on the Northeast-Southwest direction. The belt extends for approximately 2500 km in the East-West direction.

== Geology ==
The Central Asian Orogenic Belt has a long and complicated geological history. Through mapping, geologists concluded that the geological formation has a southward younging direction, meaning that the rocks in the north are older than the rocks in the south. Cenozoic-Mesozoic sedimentary basins can be found at the eastern portion of the Central Asian Orogenic Belt while volcanic-plutonic rocks formed from the Paleozoic to Mesozoic can be found in the middle and western portion of the Orogenic Belt. It has an extensive granitoid development as around 60% of the exposed area of the belt is made of granitoids, while most of the exposed bedrock was formed between 550 Ma and 100 Ma.

=== Main Regions of the CAOB ===
The Central Asian Orogenic Belt has complex accretionary tectonics, which is well documented in two main areas. One of them, namely "Kazakhstan Orocline", is located in the western portion of the belt, which is in North Xinjiang in China and Kokchetav-Balkash in Kazakhstan. Another one, namely "Tuva-Mongol Orocline", is located in the eastern portion of the belt, which is in Inner Mongolia, Mongolia, and southern Russia.

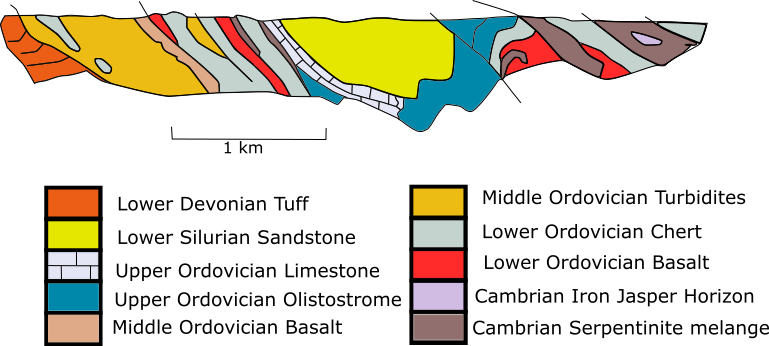
Figure 2 Cross section of part of the Kazakhstan Orocline. Adapted from Biske 2015. This figure shows a fold and nappe structure of part of the Kazakhstan Orocline. It was formed due to compressional tectonic settings. This part of the orocline is mainly composed of sedimentary rocks and extrusive igneous rocks, meaning that they should follow the law of superposition during formation. Its current syncline folding illustrates that the region experienced compressional tectonic force and the originally horizontal layers were folded later on in the geological history.

==== Kazakhstan Orocline ====
The Kazakhstan orocline, which is located in the north of the Tarim craton and Karakum craton, as well as at the south-east of Baltica, is a bend of the Central Asian Orogenic Belt, which consists of broken fragments of continents formed in the late Paleozoic.

In Precambrian time, the major terrane of the Kazakhstan orocline was mainly Mesoproterozoic metamorphic rocks, which potentially had Gondwana affinity. They were then covered by the sediments from Neoproterozoic and Cambrian to Lower Ordovician. Island arc volcanic rocks, and chert formed in deep sea environments were the dominant rock types in Paleozoic. By the end of the Ordovician and Silurian, the accretion of paleo-Kazakhstan completed, meaning that materials were added to the paleo-Kazakhstan at a subduction zone. The subsequent Devonian and Carboniferous rocks deposited on paleo-Kazakhstan were mainly volcanic rocks formed from continental arcs.

During Devonian to early Carboniferous, several unconformities were formed, together with the thrusting in the back of the Balkhash-Yili volcanic belt, documenting the event of lateral accretion of the continental crust. The collision between paleo-Kazakhstan and Tarim occurred from the middle Carboniferous to the beginning of the Permian.

The south-verging thrusts in the northern part of the South Tienshan consist of ophiolites, accreted high-grade metamorphic rocks, basalts and cherts formed in deep sea environments. These rocks were thrusted upon the carbonates and turbidites of the southern continents during Silurian to Carboniferous. In the late Paleozoic, these rocks were deformed in two phases.

Some well-developed strike slip faults can be found in Kazakhstan.

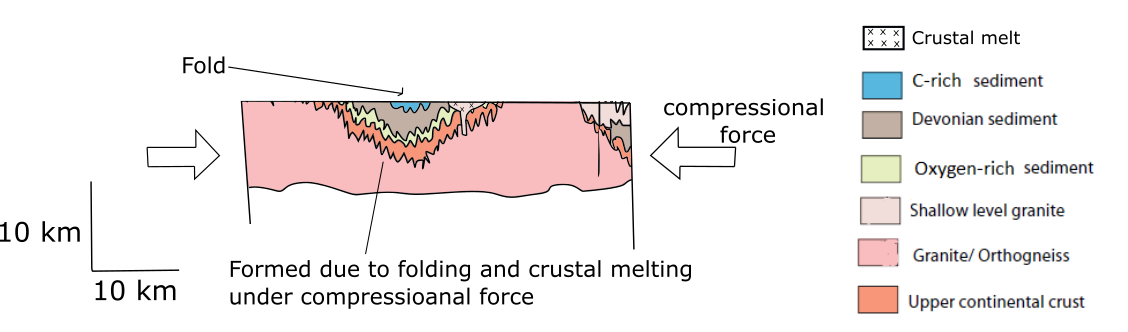
Figure 3 Cross section of part of the Tuva Mongolia Orocline. Adapted from Lehmann et al. 2010. This cross section indicates that the rocks were folded under compressional force, and were partially melted due to friction, causing crustal melting, and thus the formation of the Tuva-Mongolia Orocline.

==== Tuva-Mongolia Orocline ====
The geology of Tuva-Mongolia orocline can be divided into two major parts. One of which was formed in the Precambrian, while the other one consists of sedimentary rocks in the north and volcanic rocks which formed in the Paleozoic in the south of the orocline.

For the northern portion of the orocline, it contains Precambrian to early Paleozoic metamorphic rocks, Neoproterozoic ophiolites, volcanic rocks formed in the early Paleozoic island arcs, and some associated volcaniclastic sediments. These rocks were then covered by the Devonian to Carboniferous sediments and were influenced by the volcanic activities during the Permian. For the southern portion of the Tuva-Mongolia Orocline, the majority of rocks there are early to late Paleozoic volcanic rocks with ophiolites formed during ocean closures, most notably the closure of the Palaeo-Asian Ocean that began in the Early Carboniferous and ended in the Late Permian or Early Triassic. The volcaniclastic sediments formed during Late Carboniferous to Permian were also common in this region. For both portions in the Tuva-Mongolia Orocline, intrusions of granites occurred after the mountain building events and were covered by the volcanic and sedimentary rocks which formed during Jurassic to Cretaceous.

=== Ophiolites in CAOB ===
Ophiolites, which are uplifted and exposed fragments of oceanic crusts with pieces of upper mantle, are considered to be able to provide important information regarding the history of formation and evolution of the orogenic belt. The following table shows the locations of some of the ophiolites that can be found in the Central Asian Orogenic Belt and the related interpretation on the evolutionary history of the Central Asian Orogenic Belt

Table 1: Details and interpretation of the ophiolites found in CAOB
Age	Location	Name of the complex	Rock Type	Interpretation
1020 Ma	Sayan belt in the southern margin of the Siberian Craton	Dunzhugur Complex	Plagiogranite	Indication of the existence of the Paleo-Asian Ocean since the latest Mesoproterozoic.
971-892 Ma	Southern margin of Siberia and in Mongolia	Neoproterozoic ophiolitic melanges	Plagiogranite, basalt and gabbro	The ophiolites become younger when going from north to south. This indicates that the CAOB had grown slowly to the south.
571 Ma	Northwest Mongolia	Dariv ophiolites	Microgabbro and plagiogranites	The ophiolites become younger when going from north to south. This indicates that the CAOB had grown slowly to the south.
568 Ma	Northwest Mongolia	Khantaishir ophiolites	Microgabbro and plagiogranites	The ophiolites become younger when going from north to south. This indicates that the CAOB had grown slowly to the south.
697-628 Ma	Northern part of the Great Khingan Range	-	-	The ophiolites become younger when going from north to south. This indicates that the CAOB had grown slowly to the south.
Cambrian	South Mongolia, West Junggar, East Junggar Almantai, Hongliuhe and Xichangjing in the Beishan Orogen	-	-	The ophiolites become younger when going from north to south. This indicates that the CAOB had grown slowly to the south.

== Geological Evolution ==
Being an accretionary orogen, the geological evolutionary history of the Central Asian Orogenic Belt is highly complicated. There are two major evolutionary hypotheses that have been proposed. One of the hypotheses posits that oceanic arcs and possible continental blocks derived from Gondwana were added to the Siberian, Russian, and North China cratons via accretion. Another hypothesis suggests that the Central Asian collage is made of accumulated Paleozoic materials that were derived from subduction, accretion, and deformation of a single magmatic arc. Even though the Orogenic Belt has been at the forefront of the research of accretionary orogens, there is no consensus on the formation history of the Central Asian Orogenic Belt.

Further explanation of the two hypotheses for the geological evolution of the Central Asian Orogenic Belt is provided below.

=== Two hypotheses of the formation of CAOB ===
==== First hypothesis ====
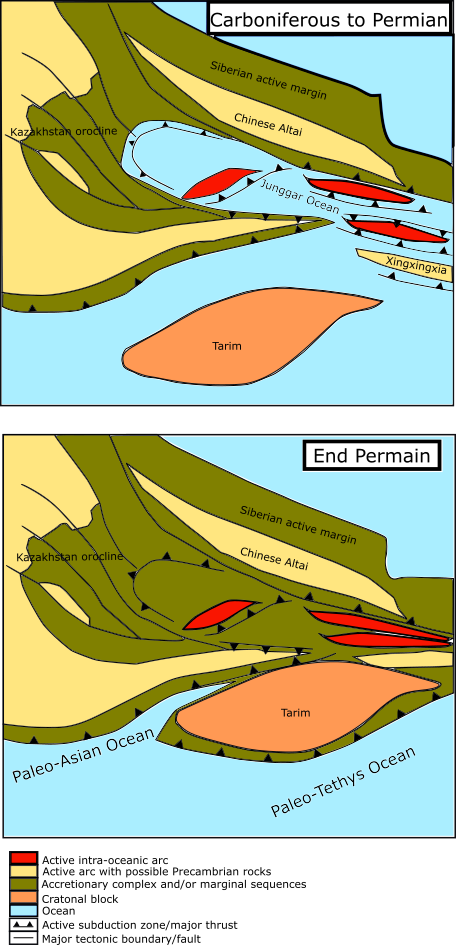
Figure 4 Diagram showing the formation process of Northern Xinjiang of the CAOB in the first hypothesis. Adapted from Xiao et al. 2008. This hypothesis illustrates that the Central Asian Orogenic Belt was formed accretion of multiple oceanic arcs and continental fragments.

The first hypothesis states that the southern margin of the Siberian continent was formed from the accretion of multiple oceanic arcs and possibly parts of continents derived from Gondwana, a supercontinent existed from the Neoproterozoic to Jurassic, to the Russia, Siberian, and North China cratons.

This hypothesis suggests that subduction of orogens in the Central Asian Orogenic Belt started in the late Precambrian and the Orogenic Belt reached its highest altitude with the amalgamation of Tarim's passive margin and northern accretionary system until the end Permian and middle Triassic. This hypothesis states that the Central Asian Orogenic Belt involved numerous subduction, collision in parallel orientation, accretion, amalgamation of microcontinents and bending of oroclines.

It is still debated whether the microcontinents derived from Gondwana were involved in the formation of the Central Asian Orogenic Belt in this hypothesis since the original structure of the Orogenic Belt is highly deformed and broken through tectonic evolution.

==== Second hypothesis ====
The second hypothesis proposed by geologist Celal Sengor in 1993 suggested that the Central Asian Orogenic Belt was formed due to the accumulation of Paleozoic subduction-accretion materials against a single magmatic arc. The entire process of the formation of Central Asian Orogenic Belt is explained below and summarized in Table 2 and Figure 5.

This hypothesis suggests that Baltica craton was attached with Siberia craton during the period Ediacaran. Their locations during Ediacaran were confirmed from paleomagnetic data. Continental rifting between Baltica and Siberia happened from late Ediacaran to Cambrian (610-520 Myr). During this period, collision of microcontinents and subduction happened at the north of the Siberia craton. During the Middle Silurian (430-424 Myr), the Kipchak arc, which is the fragment formed due to the rifting of Baltica and Siberia, had its northern end attached to the Siberia craton and its southern end free from attachment to the Baltica craton. Meanwhile, the accretionary complex formed during the subduction of microcontinents at the north of the Siberia craton and the amount of accretionary materials at the Kipchak arc decreased towards the southwest as it was more away from the source in Siberia. During the Early Devonian (390-386 Myr), there was no more addition growth of subduction-accretion complexes at the southern end of the Kipchak arc due to the abrupt influx of thick layer of Early Devonian clastic materials and the simultaneous decrease in subduction-related magmatism. This could be explained by collision of Mugodzhar arc at the north of Baltica with the southern end of the Kipchak arc. On the other hand, a subduction-accretion wedge started to grow at the north of the Kipchak arc. By Late Devonian (367-362 Myr), subduction-accretion and arc magmatism produced a continental crust that had a normal thickness. During Early Carboniferous (332-318 Myr), the Baltica craton migrated towards Siberia craton, which led to the subduction under the original southern end of the Kipchak arc. During the Late Carboniferous (318-303 Myr), Baltica and Siberia experienced right-lateral shearing, combined with compressional force, the entire Kazakhstan orocline became more tightly packed. Until the Early Permian (269-260 Myr), the Nurol basin, which is a stretched continental crust, was formed and alkaline magmatism occurred at its basement. Finally, during the Late Permian (225–251 Myr), the shearing direction of Baltica and Siberia reversed as the Gornostaev shear zone moved to the south and east of Siberia. With this final act during the Late Permian, Sengor's hypothesis on the Central Asian Orogenic Belt evolution was completed.

It was estimated that around 2.5 million square kilometers of juvenile materials were added to Asia in around 350 million years, making the Central Asian Orogenic Belt to be one of the most important juvenile crust formations since the end of the Proterozoic. However, some geologists suggested that the extent of juvenile crust formed during the Paleozoic is highly overestimated as many of the Phanerozoic granites found in the belt were initially formed in the Mesoproterozic and being reworked later on.

Table 2: Formation Process of CAOB according to the Hypothesis proposed by Sengor et al. 1993
Period	Year (Myr)	Event	Remarks
Ediacaran	610	–	Baltica craton and Siberia craton was attached to one another along their current northern boundaries.
Late Ediacaran – Cambrian	610-520	Continental rifting to form Baltica and Siberia craton; Collision of microcontinents and subduction happened at the north of the Siberia craton.	See Figure 5A.
Middle Silurian	430-424	Kipchak arc formation due to rifting of Baltica and Siberia; Accretionary complexes was formed due to subduction of microcontinents at the north of the Siberia craton.	The Kipchak arc had its northern end attached to the Siberia craton and its southern end free from attachment to the Baltica craton. The accretionary materials at the Kipchak arc decreased towards the southwest as it is more away from the source in Siberia. See Figure 5B.
Early Devonian	390-386	Collision of Mudgodzhar arc at the north of Baltica with the southern end of the Kipchak arc; Subduction-accretion wedge grew at the north of the Kipchak arc.	No more additional growth of subduction-accretion complexes at the southern end of the Kipchak arc due to abrupt influx of clastic materials at the southern end of the Kipchak arc and decrease in subduction-related magmatism. See Figure 5C.
Late Devonian	367-362	A continental crust was formed due to subduction-accretion and arc magmatism.	See Figure 5D.
Early Carboniferous	332-318	Baltica craton migrated towards Siberia craton.	This led to subduction under the original southern end of the Kipchak arc. See Figure 5E.
Late Carboniferous	318-303	Baltica and Siberia experienced right-lateral shearing and compressional force.	The entire Kazakhstan orocline became more tightly packed. See Figure 5F.
Early Permian	269-260	Formation of Nurol basin; Alkaline magmatism at the basement of Nurol basin.	Nurol basin was a stretched continental crust. See Figure 5G.
Late Permian	225–251	The shearing direction of Baltica and Siberia reversed as the Gornostaev shear zone moved to the south and east of Siberia.	See Figure 5H.

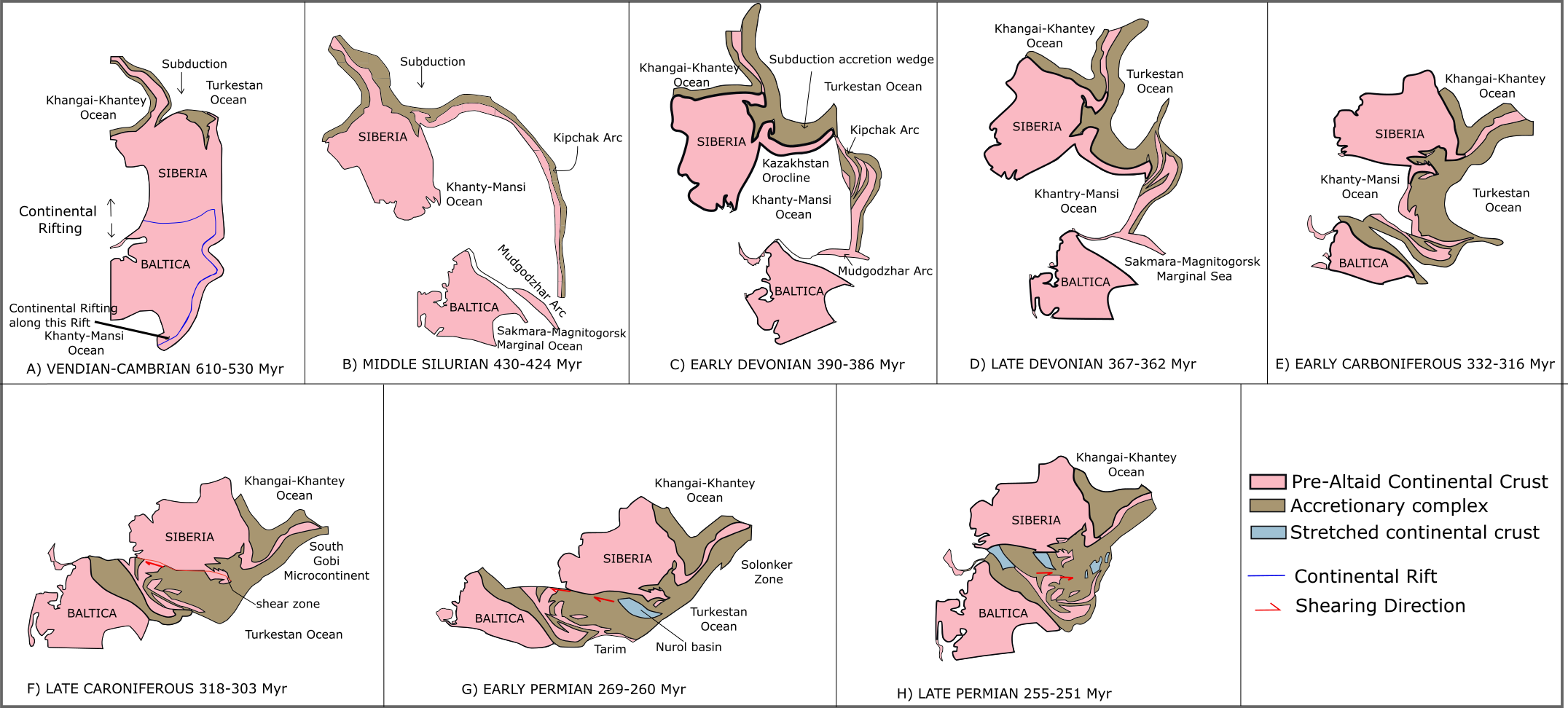
Figure 5 Diagram showing the evolutionary history of the CAOB proposed by Sengor. Adapted from Sengor 1993. This hypothesis illustrates that the Central Asian Orogenic Belt was formed due to the accumulation of accretionary complexes against a single magmatic arc. See more detailed explanations of the evolutionary history of the CAOB in Table 2.

=== Major questions ===
The Central Asian Orogenic Belt has been on the forefront of research since the 21st century. Despite international efforts of scientists, there are still many questions regarding the Central Asian Orogenic Belt that remain unanswered. They include:

- To what extent is the continental crust of the CAOB is juvenile or recycled in Phanerozoic;
- Whether microcontinents derived from Gondwana were accreted to the Siberian, Kazakhstan, Tarim and North China cratons;
- The balance between tectonic erosion and formation of continents.

== Economic significance ==
The Central Asian Orogenic Belt is rich in natural resources and more extensive study of the region would yield more benefits to society.

=== Mineral ore ===
The Central Asian Orogenic Belt is rich in mineral ores, including platinum, gold, silver and copper. The mines of these valuable metals can be found and explored according to the tectonic settings and the structures of the orogenic belt.

For platinum, its associated minerals can be found in the dunite, a type of ultramafic intrusive igneous rock, from the Xiadong Alaskan complex. The platinum would usually appear as platinum-group element sulfide and sulfarsenide. It could also appear as inclusions of chromite and clinopyroxene or as interstitial grains in the fractures of chromite.

For gold, a large gold mine was found in the Nenjian-Heihe melange zone within the CAOB. This gold mine, namely the Yongxin gold deposit, is a fracture-controlled gold deposit with a thickness of 52m at the largest ore body. Pyrite, which is the most important mineral that host gold, could be found in the mine. The CAOB is also rich in world-class copper . The Laoshankou Iron Oxide-Cu-Au deposit, which is located at the southwest of the Qinhe City, Xinjian, Northwest China, is considered as one of the most important high-quality copper and gold reserve in the Central Asian Orogenic Belt, with the deposit being hosted by the volcanic rocks formed during Middle Devonian.

=== Oil and gas ===
Since Central Asian Orogenic Belt has a complex tectonic setting, it is often being associated with different kinds of energy production in the world. Some of the richest hydrocarbon reserves in the world can be found in the region near Central Asian Orogenic Belt. Within the Orogenic Belt, oil- and gas-bearing basins were developed, such as Junggar, Santanghu, and Songliao basins, of which the former two are located at the south-western portion of the Orogenic Belt and the later one is located at the eastern portion of the Orogenic Belt. The Yinggen-Ejinaqi Basin, which is located at the southern portion of the Central Asian Orogenic Belt has been suggested to have a high potential of having a hydrocarbon reserve. Further research and analysis is required before commercial use of oil and gas can be extracted from this region.
