= Stanovoy =

Stanovoy (masculine), Stanovaya (feminine), or Stanovoye (neuter) may refer to:

- Stanovoy (rural locality) (Stanovaya, Stanovoye), name of several rural localities in Russia
- Stanovoy Highlands, a mountain range in the Transbaikal region of Siberia, Russia
- Stanovoy Range, a mountain range in the Russian Far East
- Stanovoye, a lake in North Kazakhstan
