= Orocline =

Aspect of geology

An orocline (also known as an oroclinal bend or orogenic arc) — from the Greek words for "mountain" and "to bend" — is a bend or curvature of an orogenic (mountain building) belt imposed after it was formed. The term was introduced by S. Warren Carey in 1955 in a paper setting forth how complex shapes of various orogenic belts could be explained by actual bending, and that understanding this provided "the key to understanding the evolution of the continents". Carey showed that in a dozen cases where such bends were undone the results were substantially identical with continental reconstructions deduced by other means. Recognition of oroclinal bending provided strong support to the subsequent theory of plate tectonics.

== Examples ==
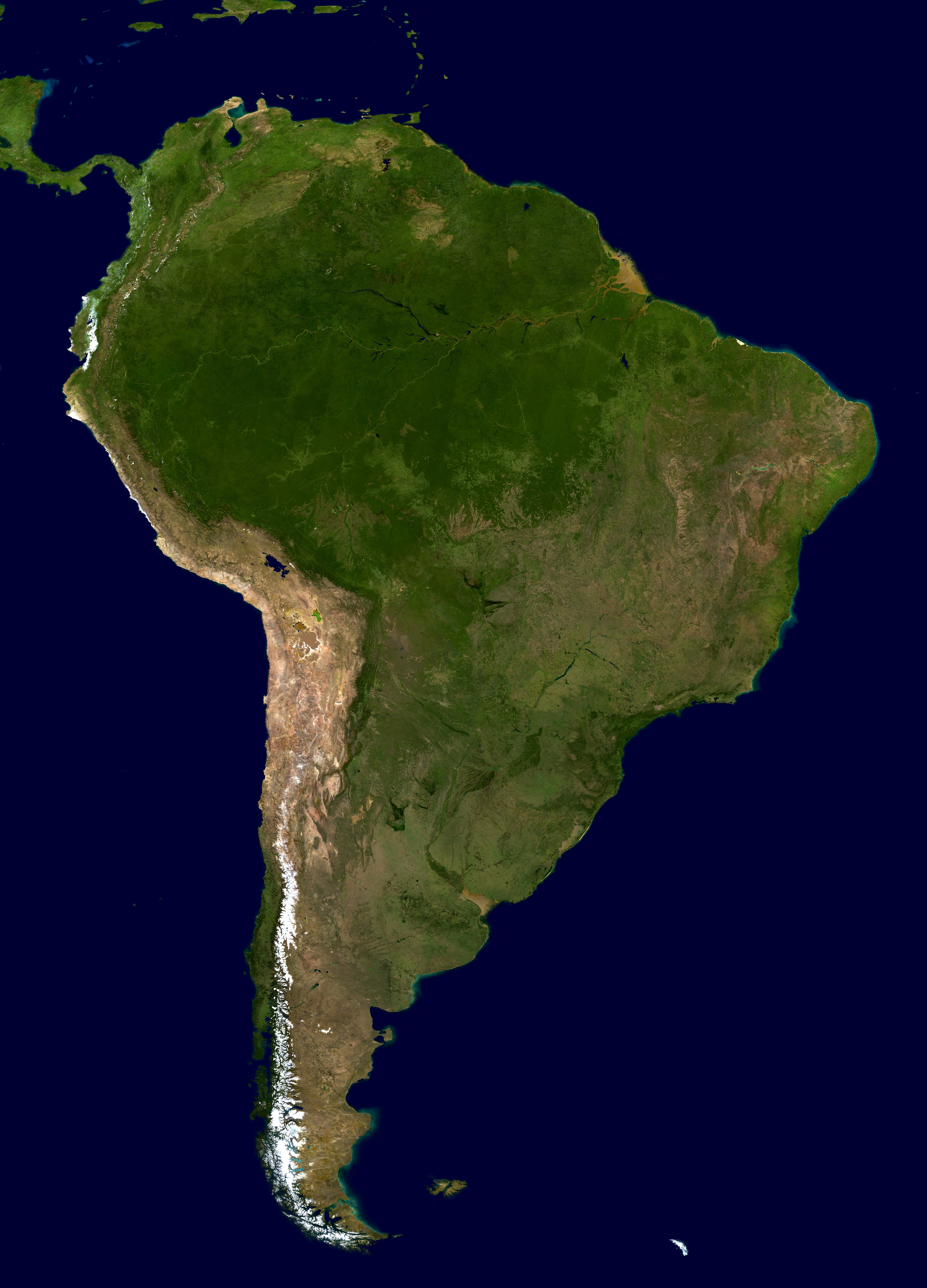
A composite relief image of South America. The Bolivian Orocline can be seen in the middle of the picture next to the Pacific Ocean. Further south it also possible to hint the less pronounced Maipo Orocline.

- The Bolivian Orocline is a seaward concave bending in the coast of South America and the Andes mountains at about 18° S. At this point the orientation of the Andes turns from Northwest in Peru to South in Chile and Argentina. The Andean segment north and south of the orocline have been rotated 15° to 20° counter clockwise and clockwise respectively. The orocline area overlaps with the area of maximum width of the Altiplano Plateau. According to Isacks (1988) the orocline is related to crustal shortening. The specific point at 18° S where the coastline bends is known as the Arica Elbow.
- The Maipo Orocline or Maipo Transition Zone is an orocline located between 30° S and 38°S in the Andes with a break in trend at 33° S.
- The Arauco Orocline a subtle orocline located at 37° S in south-central Chile. It marks a seaward-convex bend in the Andes.
- Cantabrian Orocline and Gibraltar Orocline, Spain.
- Carpathian Orocline, Romania.
- Balkan Orocline, Romania, Bulgaria and Serbia.
- Dinaric-Hellenic Orocline
- Northern Apennines Orocline, Southern Apennines Orocline and Calabrian Orocline, Italy
- Western Alps Orocline, Italy, France and Switzerland.

=== Oroclines in cratons ===
- Bothnian oroclines in the Svecofennian Domain in Finland and Sweden.
- Inari orocline including the Lapland Granulite Belt in Finland, Norway and Russia.
- Lachlan Orocline, eastern Australia
- Dabashan Orocline, China

== See also ==
- Syntaxis (geology)
