= Kazakhstania =

Geological region in Central Asia

Kazakhstania (Kazakh: Qazaqstaniya), the Kazakh terranes, or the Kazakhstan Block, is a geological region in Central Asia which consists of the area roughly centered on Lake Balkhash, north and east of the Aral Sea, south of the Siberian craton and west of the Altai Mountains. The Junggar Basin in Xinjiang, China, is also part of Kazakhstania but is sometimes referred to as the Junggar Block.

Because the Kazakh terranes merged during the Late Ordovician as part of the Central Asian Orogenic Belt, they are also referred to as the Kazakh Orogen. Those terranes are located in what are today Kazakhstan, north-eastern Uzbekistan, northern Kyrgyzstan. and north-western China.

Today, Kazakhstania is surrounded by three large, former continents: to the north-east, the Gornostaev Shear Zone separates it from Siberia with which it collided during the Carboniferous; to the north-west is Baltica, which lay adjacent to the Kazakh Tourgai terrane but far away from Kazakhstania; to the south and east was Gondwana, stretching from the South Pole to the Equator. Not far away from the dispersed Kazakh terranes were South China, North China, and Tarim, but how those continental blocks were positioned relative to Gondwana is not known.

== Tectonic evolution ==
In the Early Palaeozoic the Kazakh terranes were widely distributed north or northeast of the Mangyshlak, Karakum, Karakoram and Tarim terranes. The location, origin, and faunal affinities of these terranes has, however, been the subject of two competing hypotheses: one described those terranes as an enormous island arc called the Kipchak arc, the other as a series of more or less parallel belts. Faunal analyses indicate that some of the terranes probably originated in Gondwana rather than Baltica or Siberia. A 2006 analysis of brachiopods indicated that the Chu-Ili Mountains must have formed an independent Peri-Gondwanan terrane in the Late Ordovician, located not far from the North and South China cratons.

More recent studies suggest that in the Late Ordovician. the Kazakh terranes formed an archipelago composed of clusters of island arcs and microcontinents centered on the Equator. Key units in this assemblage were the Boshchekul (in north Kazakhstan), Chingiz-Tarbagatai (east Kazakhstan), and Chu-Ilu (south Kazakhstan) terranes. The Atashu-Zhamshi microcontinent was located in the southwestern margin of the archipelago. A few terranes probably merged as early as the Middle Ordovician, but Kazakhstania is very unlikely to have formed a single continent before the end of the period.

During the Carboniferous and Permian, Siberia collided with Kazakhstania to form the Altai Mountains, and Baltica Siberia collided in the Uralian orogeny, creating the basis for most of present-day Eurasia.

== Commercial importance ==
Kazakhstania is mainly flat: only in the east near Karaganda are there mountains, which rise only to 1,565 metres (5,130 feet) in the Tarbagatay Range. Although most of Kazakhstania is arid, and practically no water flows from the region to the oceans, there is extensive grazing of cattle, sheep and camels on the grasslands that cover most of the region today. Kazakhstania was too dry for extensive glaciation during the Quaternary.

Kazakhstania contains as much as a quarter of the world's proven uranium reserves and is also one of the world's major source of lead, zinc, and antimony ores. On the southern boundary, in the Turan Depression, are large deposits of natural gas.

== See also ==
- List of shields and cratons
