= Siberia (continent) =

Ancient craton forming the Central Siberian Plateau

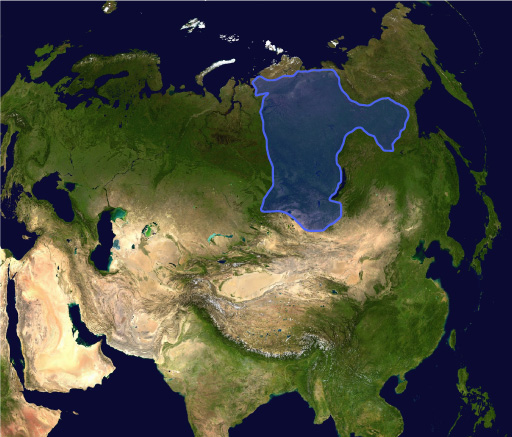
Current location of the remains of the ancient landmass of Siberia in north Asia

Siberia, also known as Siberian Craton, Angaraland (or simply Angara) and Angarida, is an ancient craton in the heart of Siberia. Today forming the Central Siberian Plateau, it formed an independent landmass prior to its fusion into Pangaea during the late Carboniferous-Permian. The Verkhoyansk Sea, a passive continental margin, was fringing the Siberian Craton to the east in what is now the East Siberian Lowland.

Angaraland was named in the 1880s by Austrian geologist Eduard Suess who erroneously believed that in the Paleozoic Era there were two large continents in the Northern Hemisphere: "Atlantis", which was North America connected to Europe via a peninsula (Greenland and Iceland), and "Angara-land", which would have been eastern Asia, named after the Angara River in Siberia.

== Tectonics ==
About 2.5 billion years ago (in the Siderian Period), Siberia was part of a continent called Arctica, along with the Canadian Shield. Around 1.1 billion years ago (in the Stenian Period), Siberia became part of the supercontinent of Rodinia, which lasted until the Tonian about 750 million years ago when it broke up, and Siberia became part of the landmass of Protolaurasia. During the Ediacaran Period around 600 million years ago, Protolaurasia became part of the southern supercontinent of Pannotia. Around 550 million years ago, both Pannotia and Protolaurasia split up to become the continents of Laurentia, Baltica and Siberia.

Paleomap of Earth's continents and oceans in the middle of the Ordovician Period, about 470 million years ago (SI=Siberia, LA=Laurentia, BA=Baltica)

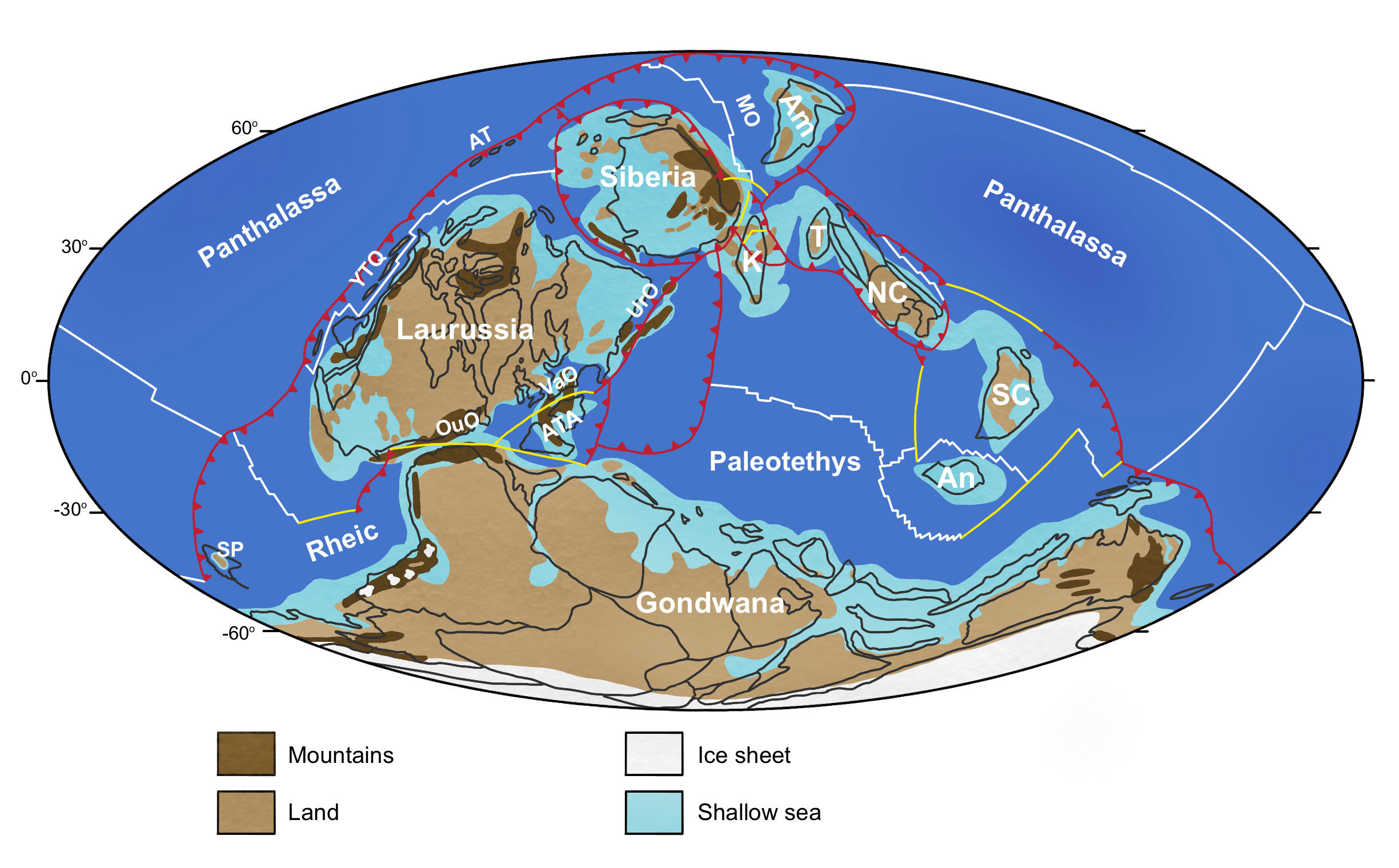
Map of the world during the Early Carboniferous, showing the position of Siberia/Angaraland shortly prior to the formation of Pangaea

Siberia was an independent continent through the early Paleozoic until, during the Carboniferous Period, it collided with the minor continent of Kazakhstania. A subsequent collision with Euramerica/Laurussia during the Late Carboniferous-Permian formed Pangaea.

Pangaea split up during the Jurassic though Siberia stayed with Laurasia. Laurasia gradually split up during the Cretaceous with Siberia remaining part of present-day northeastern Eurasia. Today, Siberia forms part of the landmass of Afro-Eurasia. To the east it is joined to the North American plate at the Chersky Range. In around 250 million years from now Siberia may be in the subtropical region and part of the new supercontinent of Pangaea Proxima.

== Features ==
- Akitkan Orogen
- Aldan Shield
- Anabar Shield
- Birekte terrane
- Daldyn terrane
- Magan terrane
- Olenyok Uplift
- Stanovoy tectonic zone
- Tunguska Basin
- Tungus terrane
