= Accretion (geology) =

Geological process by which material is added to a tectonic plate at a subduction zone

Oceanic-continental convergence and creation of accretionary wedge

Stages of accretion through time with accretionary wedge and volcanic island arc

In geology, accretion is a process by which material is added to a tectonic plate at a subduction zone, frequently on the edge of existing continental landmasses. The added material may be sediment, volcanic arcs, seamounts, oceanic crust or other igneous features.

== Description ==
Accretion involves the addition of material to a tectonic plate via subduction, the process by which one plate is forced under the other when two plates collide. The plate which is being forced down, the subducted plate, is pushed against the upper, over-riding plate. Sediment on the ocean floor of the subducting plate is often scraped off as the plate descends. This accumulated material is called an accretionary wedge (or accretionary prism), which is pushed against and attaches to the upper plate. In addition to accumulated ocean sediments, volcanic island arcs or seamounts present on the subducting plate may be amalgamated onto existing continental crust on the upper plate, increasing the continental landmass.

== Continent building ==
Continental crust differs significantly from oceanic crust. Oceanic crust is primarily composed of basaltic rocks, which have a higher density than the rocks making up the majority of continental crust. Island arcs and other volcanic rocks are also lower in density than the oceanic crust, and are therefore not easily subducted along with the oceanic crust that surrounds them. Instead, these less-dense bits of crust will collide with existing continental crust on the upper plate once the oceanic crust separating them is completely subducted. Most continents are composed of multiple accreted "terranes", pieces of low-density continental crust with different origins. For example, North America is made up of multiple accreted terranes that collided with the Laurentian proto-continent, such as the Proterozoic Yavapai, Mazatzal, and Grenville Province Terranes. Accreted terranes along modern subduction plate boundaries include the Nankai accretionary complex of Japan (subduction of the Philippine Plate beneath the Eurasian Plate), the Barbados Ridge in the Caribbean (subduction of the Caribbean Plate beneath the North American Plate), and the Mediterranean Ridge (subduction of the African Plate beneath the Eurasian Plate). These examples of accreted terranes also all include accretionary wedges.
