= White Sea Rift System =

Complex of tectonic rifts in the White Sea

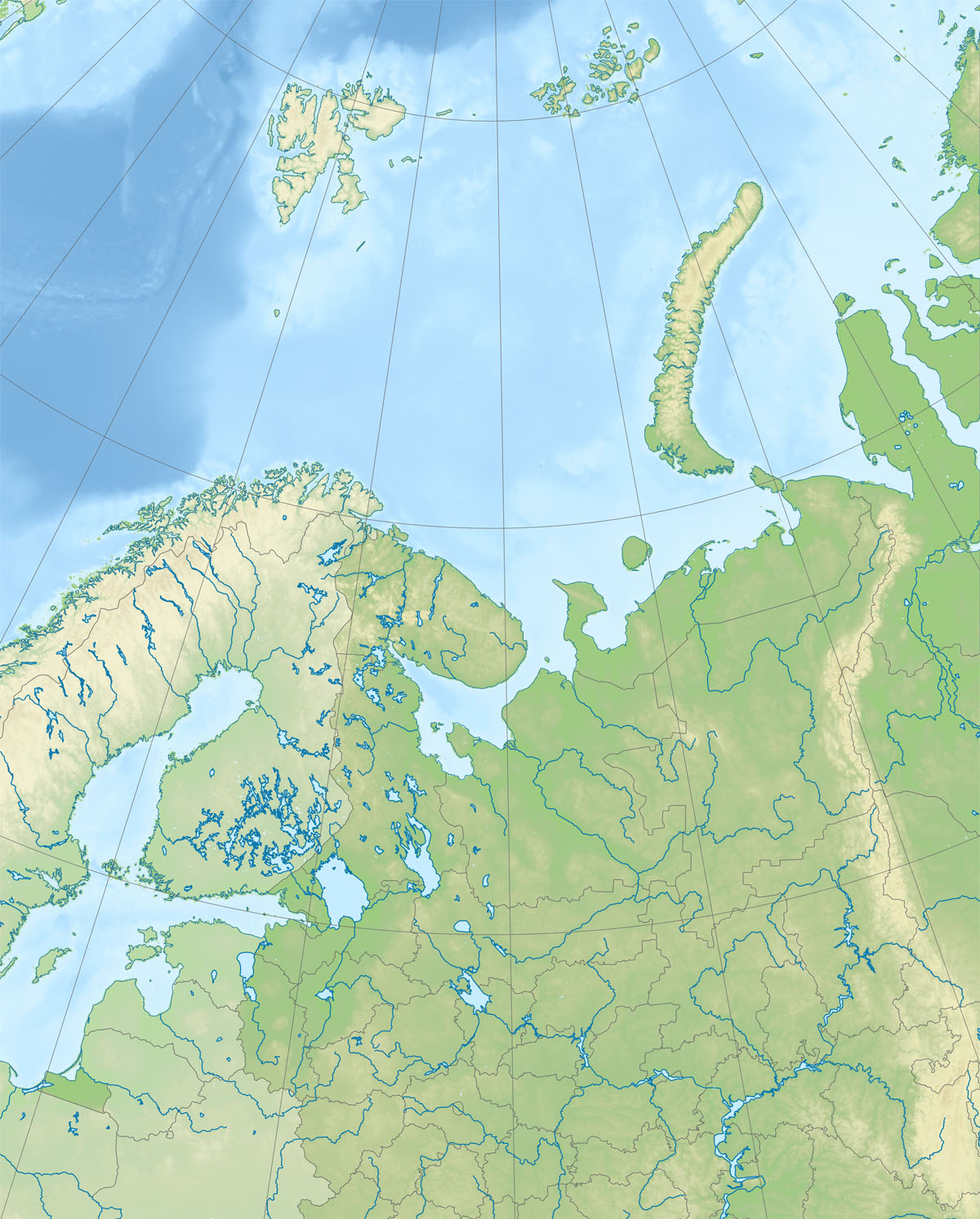
Location of Kerets Graben, one of many grabens in the White Sea.

The White Sea Rift System is a complex of rifts manifested as numerous individual grabens located chiefly in the White Sea but including onshore areas and a strip of the Barents Sea. The rifts run in a subparallel manner from northwest to southeast where the rift system continues under the East European Platform. The system or complex originated due to extensional tectonics acting during the Middle to Late Riphean in the Proterozoic. This tectonic environment is believed to have been related to the break-up of the ancient supercontinent Palaeopangea. During the Riphean the graben structures were filled by Jotnian sediments. During the Middle Paleozoic the rift system was reactivated resulting in intrusion of alkaline magmas. In the Late Cenozoic the rift system was reactivated again resulting in the formation of the modern White Sea.

The White Sea Rift System includes the following rifts:

- the Onega–Kandalaksha Rift (its northwestern graben is known as the Kandalaksha Trough or Kandalaksha Graben). The Kandalksha graben is about 220 km long and 60 km broad. Its southwestern slopes are steeper than its northwestern slopes.
- the Kerets–Leshukonsky Rift (including the Kerets Graben).
- the Barents Rift. (Note: Scholars Zhuravlev and Shipilov lists the Mezen Rift System (southern part of the Barents Rift) as distinct from the White Sea Rift System.)

Many of the grabens are filled with Jotnian sediments.
