= Ectasian =

Second period of the Mesoproterozoic Era

- 1400 – 1200 Ma
- Map of Earth in the middle Ectasian, c. 1300 Ma

Chronology
Events of the Ectasian Period; Vertical axis scale: Millions of years ago

Etymology
- Name formality: Formal

Usage information
- Celestial body: Earth
- Regional usage: Global (ICS)
- Time scale(s) used: ICS Time Scale

Definition
- Chronological unit: Period
- Stratigraphic unit: System
- Time span formality: Formal
- Lower boundary definition: Defined chronometrically
- Lower GSSA ratified: 1990
- Upper boundary definition: Defined chronometrically
- Upper GSSA ratified: 1990

The Ectasian Period (from Ancient Greek: ἔκτασις, romanized: éktasis, meaning "extension") is the second geologic period in the Mesoproterozoic Era and lasted from 1400 Mya to 1200 Mya (million years ago). Instead of being based on stratigraphy, these dates are defined chronometrically.

Geologically, the name refers to the continued expansion of platform covers during this period. In the early Ectasian period, a day was 17 hours and 32 minutes. At the end of the Ectasian, it was 18 hours and 28 minutes.

== Geology ==
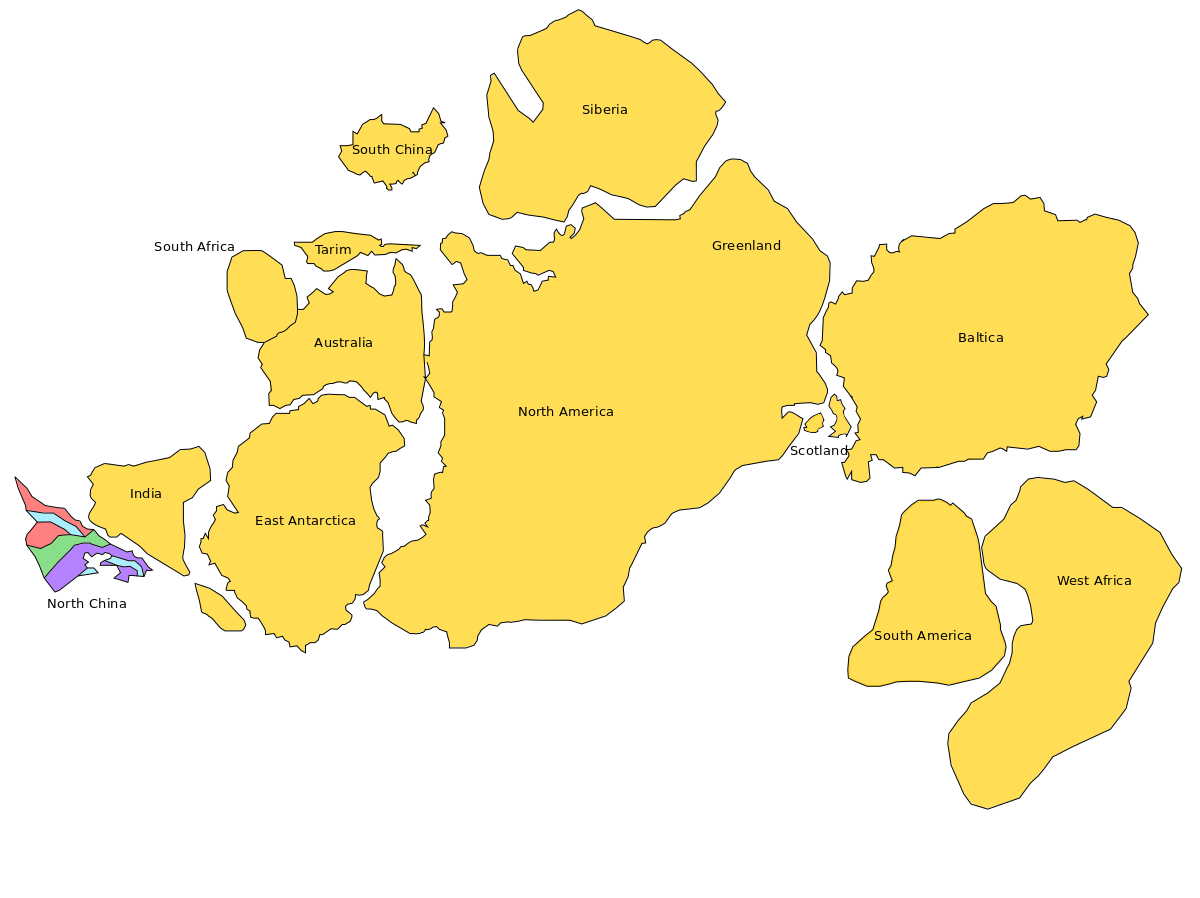
A possible configuration of continents in the supercontinent Columbia before breaking up.

The early Ectasian has the supercontinent Columbia intact until at least 1.35 Ga with rifting around the western side of Laurentia. Columbia slowly destabilized until it fully broke up around 1.3-1.2 Ga at the mid to end Ectasian with multiple dyke swarms including the Mackenzie dike swarm at in Canada and the Galiwinku dyke swarm in Australia. Evidence from metamafic rocks from 1.37 to 1.35 Ga suggests that a superplume formed around that time and affected 3 provinces, causing expansion and the breakup of Columbia.

== Biology ==
The Dismal Lakes group ranging from 1590 to 1270 Mya hosts microfossils that are interpreted to be eukaryotes, with various species appearing in the grouping.

Continued appearances of acritarchs are present in the Ectasian period with a moderate amount of eukaryotes.

== Climate ==
The very beginning of the Ectasian had the end of the Mesoproterozoic Oxidation Event which lasted from 1.59 to 1.36 Ga, with estimations going up to 3.6% current levels of oxygen. Besides this, the Ectasian had oxygen conditions typical of the Boring Billion, from 0.1% to 1% of current oxygen levels in most conditions.

The seafloor during the Ectasian is around 50-80% oxidated at the beginning of the period and declined afterwards. The ocean was mostly ferruginous in lower depths with a minority surface area being oxic and recurring euxinic conditions in mid-depth waters.

The water temperature during the Mesoproterozoic is reported to be 26.9 ± 0.4 degrees Celsius with the water being lighter than the current ocean water. Shallow seafloors may have "oxygen oases" by microbial mats oxygenating the seafloor, allowing aerobic organisms to survive.

== See also ==
- Boring Billion – Earth history, 1.8 to 0.8 billion years ago
- Jotnian – Oldest known sediments in the Baltic area that have not been subject to metamorphism
- Riphean age – Stage in the geological timescale named after the Urals
