= Western Ethiopian Shield =

The Western Ethiopian Shield is a small geological shield along the western border of Ethiopia. Its plutons were formed between 830 and 540 million years ago.

== See also ==
- Craton
- Platform
- Basement
- Platform basement
