= Atlantic Shield =

Geological shield in eastern South America

Approximate location of Mesoproterozoic (older than 1.3 Ga) cratons in South America and Africa.

The Atlantic Shield is a large geological shield located in eastern South America. The shield is made up of the cratons of São Luís, São Francisco, Luís Alves and Río de la Plata.
