= Hallandian-Danopolonian event =

The Hallandian-Danopolonian event was an orogeny and thermal event that affected Baltica in the Mesoproterozoic. The event metamorphosed pre-existing rocks and generated magmas that crystallized into granite. The Hallandian-Danopolonian event has been suggested to be responsible for forming an east-west alignment of sedimentary basins hosting Jotnian sediments spanning from eastern Norway, to Lake Ladoga in Russia. The alignment of subsidence is thought to correspond to an ancient back-arc basin parallel to a subduction zone further south.
