= Platform (geology) =

Continental area covered by relatively flat or gently tilted, mainly sedimentary strata

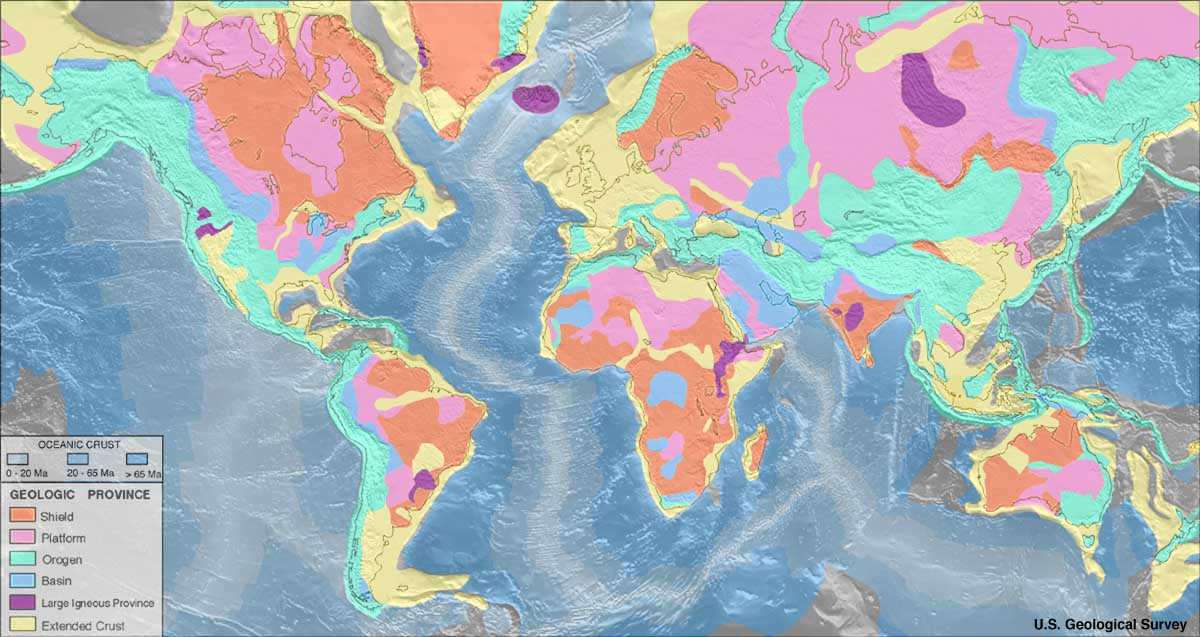
Geologic provinces of the world (USGS): Shield Platform Orogen Basin Large igneous province Extended crust / Oceanic crust: 0–20 Ma 20–65 Ma >65 Ma

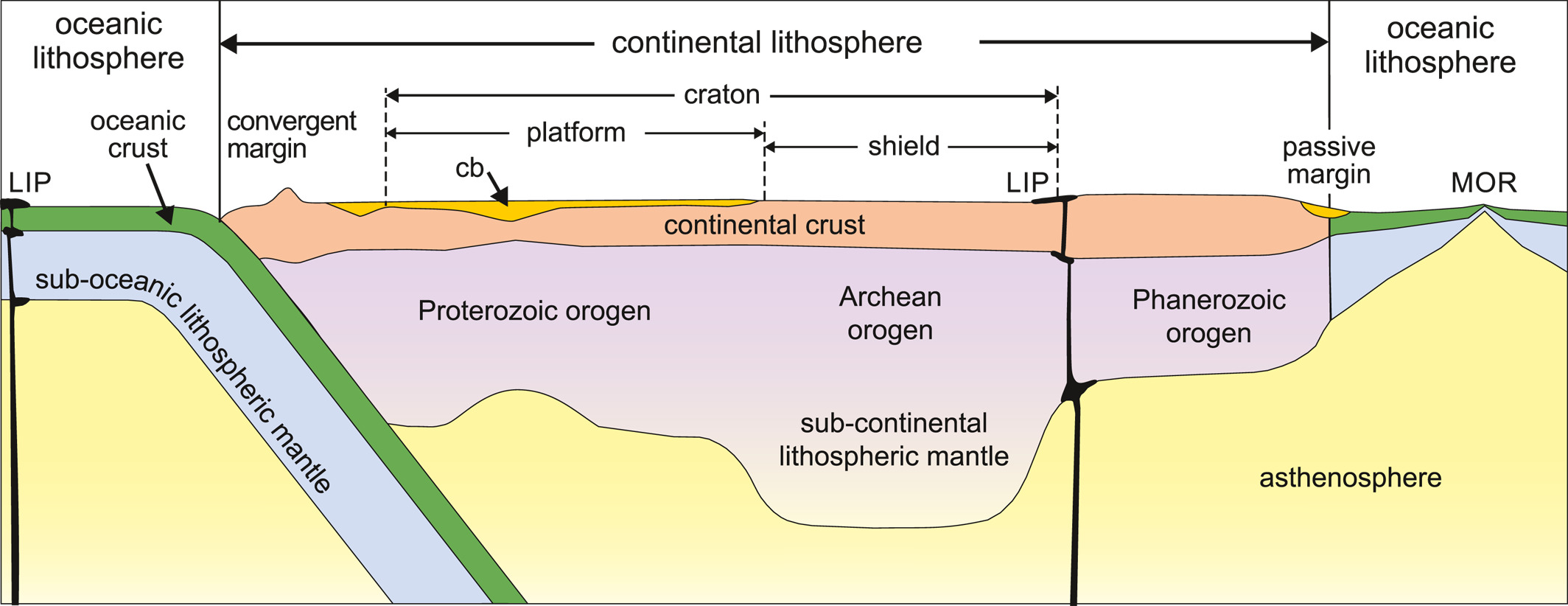
Idealized cross-section of Earth's lithosphere, including the relationship between cratons, shields and platforms (Abbreviations: cb=cratonic basin, LIP=large igneous province, MOR=mid-ocean ridge)

In geology, platform is a craton covered with sediments. It can be classified into the following groups: a "protoplatform" of metamorphosed sediments at the bottom, a "quasiplatform" of slightly deformed sediments, a "cataplatform", and an "orthoplatform" at the top. The Mesoproterozoic Jotnian sediments of the Baltic area are examples of a "quasiplatform". The post-Ordovician rocks of the South American Platform are examples of an orthoplatform.

== See also ==
- Carbonate platform
- East European Platform
- List of shields and cratons
