= Jotnian =

Oldest known sediments in the Baltic area that have not been subject to metamorphism

In north European geology, Jotnian (Note: The term "Jotnian" comes the Old Norse word "Jötunn" roughly meaning "giant". Jakob Sederholm was the first to differentiate the rocks and use the term "Jotnian" in 1897.) sediments are a group of Precambrian rocks assigned to the Mesoproterozoic Era (Riphean), albeit some might be younger. Jotnian sediments include the oldest known sediments in the Baltic area that have not been subject to metamorphism. Stratigraphically, Jotnian sediments overlie the rapakivi granites and other igneous and metamorphic rocks and are often intruded by younger diabases.

== Overview ==
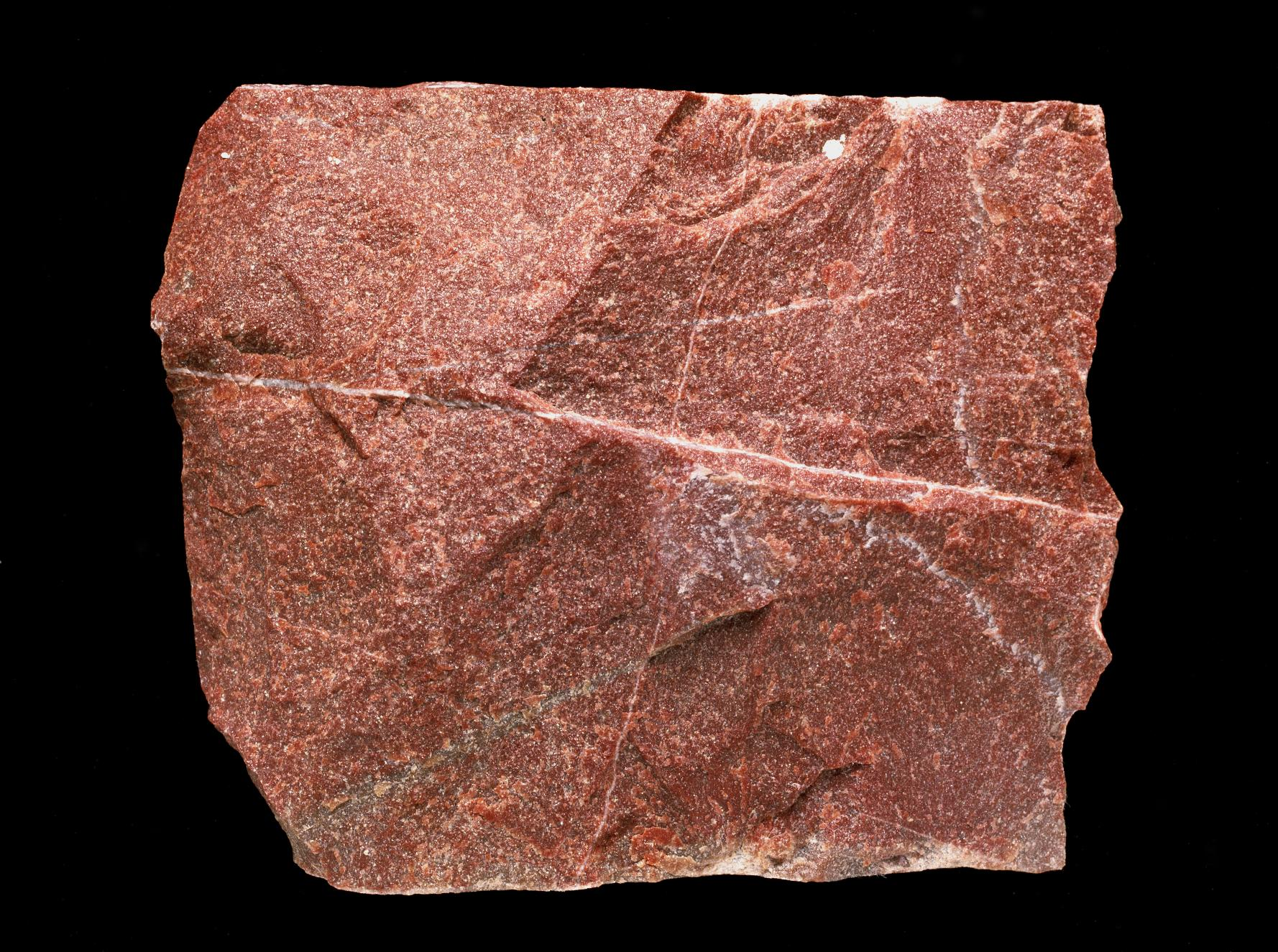
Gävle sandstone (Swedish: Gävlesandsten) a Jotnian sedimentary rock

Jotnian sediments include quartz-rich sandstones, siltstones, arkose, shale and conglomerates. The characteristic red colour of Jotnian sediments is due to their deposition in subaerial (e.g. non-marine) conditions. Jotnian sediments are the oldest known sediments in the Baltic area that have not been subject to metamorphism.

Their age is poorly constrained, but generally they are younger than the rapakivi granites and older than Postjotnian (Note: Wilhelm Ramsay coined the term "Postjotnian" in 1909.) diabases that intrude the sediments. This means that Jotnian sediments were deposited approximately 1600–1260 million years ago. Some Jotnian sediments are, however, younger than the diabases, meaning they can be younger than 1260 million years. Jotnian sediments are usually assigned to the Riphean Stage of the Mesoproterozoic Era. Jotnian sediments rests on what is known as Subjotnian (Note: "Subjotnian" was first used by Arvid Högbom in 1910. In 1932 Sederholm proposed independently the name "Hoglandian" for what Högbom called "Subjotnian".) rocks which include weathered rapakivi granites and the Hogland Series. Amantov and co-workers comments about the terms Jotnian and Postjotnian that:

the terms should be interpreted as more descriptive (i.e. the diabase usually cuts the sandstone) than temporal (all the Jotnian sandstones not necessarily older than all the Postjotnian diabases).

At large scale, Jotnian sediments are classified as being part of a "quasiplatform" group of sediments of the East European Platform not being metamorphosed enough to be part of the "protoplatform" and not being undeformed enough to be part of the "cataplatform" category. By analogy to the established Sub-Cambrian peneplain that extends across much of Fennoscandia there have been suggestions of the existence of an exhumed Subjotnian peneplain. This surface actually exists but its extent is very limited, represented as small valley plains at Sveg and along the Västerdalälven-Dalälven system.

== Distribution ==
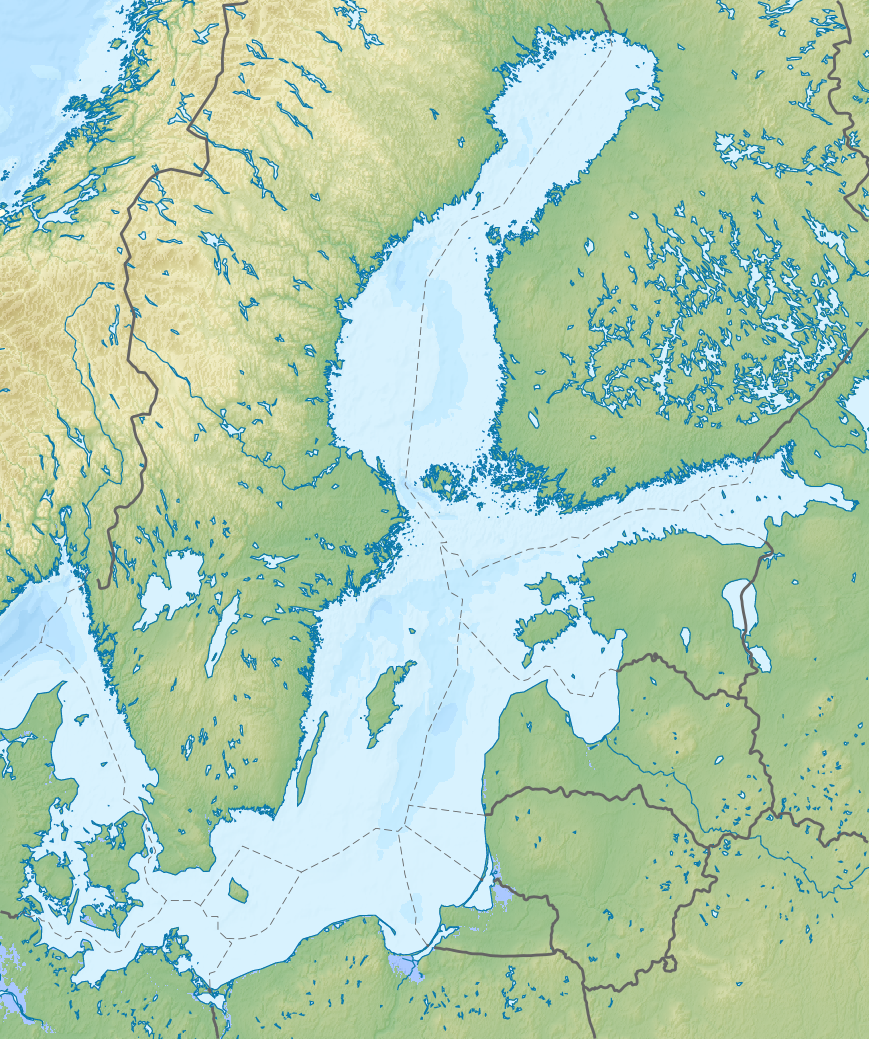
Selection of outcrop localities mentioned in the text.

There is evidence suggesting that Jotnian cover rocks or a Jotnian platform once covered much of Fennoscandia and were not restricted to a few localities like today. The limited geographical extent of Jotnian sediments at present is indebted to their erosion over geological time. Sedimentary rocks as old as the Jotnian sediments age have a low preservation potential. The distribution of some Jotnian sediments is spatially associated with the occurrence of rapakivi granite. (Note: Some geologists of the first half of the 20th century regarded the rapakivi granites as "granitized" Jotnian sediments, an idea which is now discredited.) Korja and co-workers (1993) claim the Jotnian sediment–rapakivi granite coincidence at the Gulf of Finland and the Gulf of Bothnia is associated with the existence of thin crust at these locations. At present Jotnian sedimentary rocks are commonly found in half-grabens, narrow grabens, in slightly downfolded (syncline) positions or in mixed graben-synclines. Most of the grabens hosting Jotnian sediments are northwest-southeast oriented. The largest occurrence of Jotnian sediments appear however to occur neither in a rift or a graben and lie in Dalarna, Sweden. It has been suggested that the sedimentary basins hosting Jotnian sediments at Dalarna, Gävle, the Bothnian Sea, Satakunta and Lake Ladoga form an alignment of subsidence parallel to the area of inferred Hallandian-Danopolonian subduction, possibly corresponding to an ancient back-arc basin.

=== Baltic Sea ===
Between Finland and Sweden Jotnian sediments are common in the Gulf of Bothnia, the Bothnian Sea and the Åland Sea including South Kvarken. Known Jotnian rocks at the Åland Sea are sandstones and belong to the Söderarm Formation (informal). Above these there are Upper riphean and Vendian sandstones and shales. Fully within Swedish waters there is a Jotnian sediment occurrence at the Landsort Basin between Gotland and Stockholm archipelago. Jotnian rocks found in the Landsort Basin are red sandstones. In the Bothnian Sea offshore Pori in Satakunta Jotnian sediments reaches a thickness of thousand metres, in other locations thickness is much less, for example 100 m at the Sylen shoal and yet in other places of the Bothnian Sea Jotnian sediments are absent. The Sub-Cambrian peneplain cuts across Jotnian rocks in the Bothnian Sea.

=== Finland ===
==== Muhos ====
Muhos in the northeastern Gulf of Bothnia is a site of Jotnian sediment occurrence. At this location Jotnian sediments can be found within the Muhos Graben that has had a downward displacement of about one kilometre. The sediments in the Muhos Graben at the bottom are conglomerates and arkoses whose contact with the underlying metamorphic rocks constitute an unconformity. The pebbles of the conglomerate are made of schist and granite while the matrix is made of arkose. The bulk (90–80%) of the sequence of sediments is made up of siltstones and shales. The colour of the siltstones and shales vary from red and brown to grey to green. The siltstones and shales are intercalated with arkosic sandstone. The red arkosic sandstones of Muhos Graben are comparable to the ones of Satakunta. These sediments are of fluvial origin.

==== Satakunta ====
Southern Satakunta near the shores of the Bothnian Sea hosts some Jotnian sediments known as Satakunta sandstone. This sediments are arkosic sandstones of red colour and clear stratification that are intercalated with lesser amounts of red or black shale. According to the sediments mineralogical as well as geochemical characteristics they are classified as immature. The Satakunta sandstones is a fluvial sediment formation. Based on the finding of glauconite in the Jotnian rocks of the northwestern part of the outcrop, it has been suggested that at least in that place the diagenesis occurred under water. It is found in a northwest-southeast trending graben structure (Note: That the Satakunta outcrop is in an ancient graben was first noticed by Jakob Sederholm in 1893.) that has helped to preserve the sediments. This graben has seen a downward displacement of about 650 metres. The Satakunta sandstone is not younger than 1400–1300 million years. The Satakunta sedimentary pile is at least 600 metres thick but might likely be as thick as much as 1800 metres. 1270–1250 million years old Postjotnian olivine-bearing diabase dykes cuts through the Satakunta Sandstones.

=== Russia ===
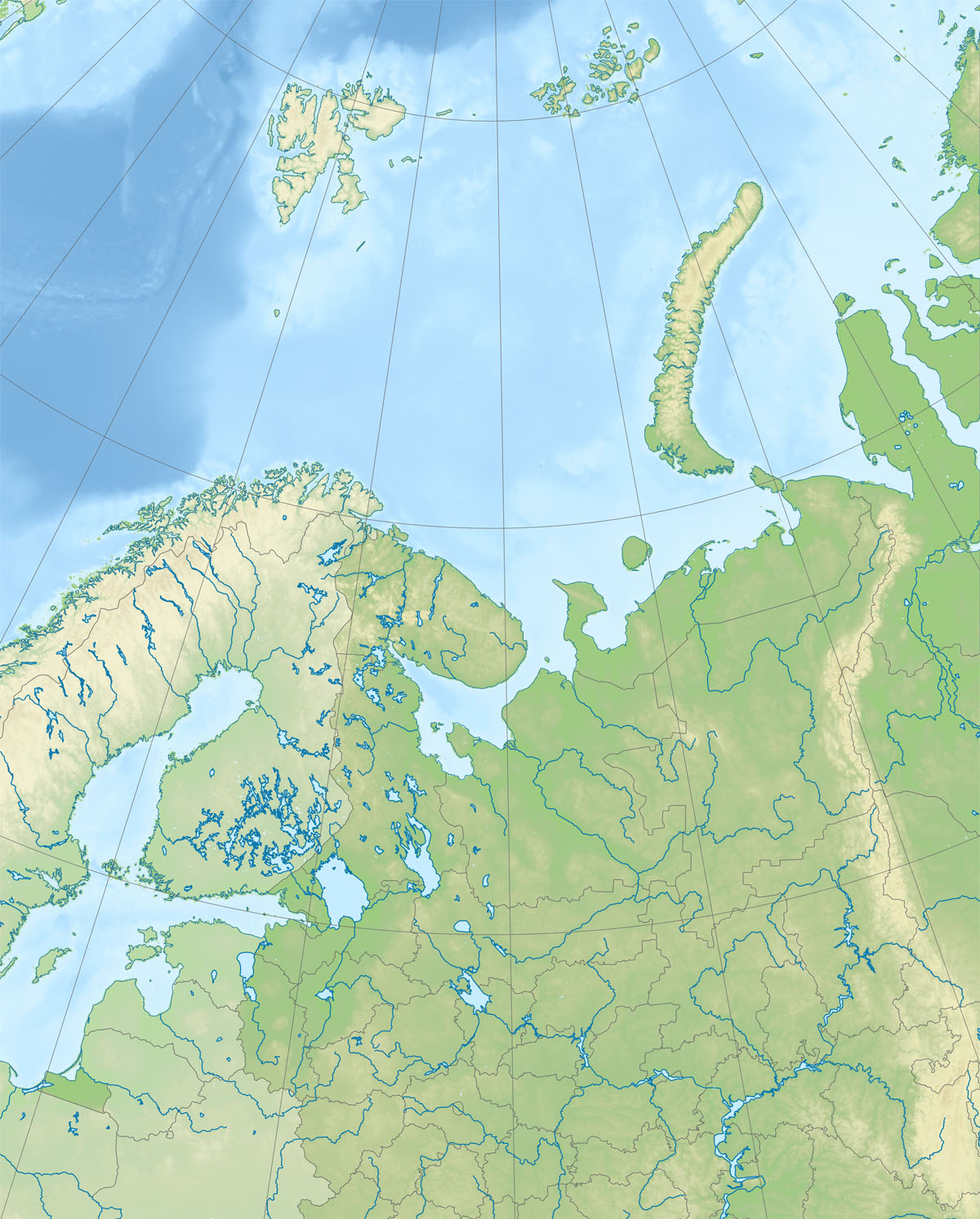
Selection of outcrop localities mentioned in the text. (G=Gävle, M=Lake Mälaren)

==== Lake Ladoga ====
Sedimentary and volcanic rocks crop out on the eastern shores of the Lake Ladoga in Russia. Among these are the "Salmi series" or "Salma suite" and the "Priosersk suite", which are Jotnian units. These rocks overlie the Salma rapakivi granite and igneous and metamorphic rocks of Paleoproterozoic age. Gritstone, sandstone and conglomerate are the sedimentary components of the Salmi suite which further includes mafic volcanic rocks. As with Satakunta and Muhos in Finland, the sediments at Lake Ladoga are located in a graben of Late Proterozoic age. The graben structure that hosts the sediments is known as the "Pasha–Ladoga structure", which is also in part a syncline, thus being referred to as graben-syncline. The maximum thickness of the pile of sediments is no less than 800 metres. Jotnian sediments are exposed only as small outcrops on land but exposures are larger at the lake bottom.

==== Rybachy Peninsula ====
The Rybachy Peninsula in northern Murmansk Oblast hosts Jotnian sedimentary rocks dated to have sedimented 1126±50 million years ago. These rocks are thrusted over by younger Vendian and Upper Riphean rocks.

==== White Sea area ====
The Jotnian Tersky Formation crops out along the Tersky Coast at the southern shores of the Kola Peninsula. These outcrops are an overfill of the neighbouring Kandalaksha Graben, which is also filled with these sediments. The formation has silty beds within a matrix of mica and clay. The Tersky Formation was deposited in the timespan between 1263 and 1080 million years ago (±40 million years of error). The neighboring Kerets Graben in the White Sea is filled with 2000–1500 metres of Jotnian sediments.

=== Sweden ===
Simplified geological map of Sweden displaying the Jotnian sandstone (Jonisk) provinces in Gävle and Dalarna.

In Sweden Jotnian rocks can be found in Dalarna, Gävle, Nordingrå, Svartälven, Lake Mälaren and Almesåkra (Almesåkra Group).

==== Almesåkra ====
The Jotnian Almesåkra Group of sediments lie in northern Småland in a triangle-shaped area centered around Nässjö, in addition to this there is a small strip of these sediments running north from the main area. The Almesåkra Group extends over an area of about 380 km^{2} (150 sq mi). The Almesåkra Group consists of feldspar-rich sandstones, argillites and minor amounts of conglomerate. The deposits are believed to be of fluvial origin. Argillites constitute about 10% of the outcrops while the sandstones and conglomerates make up the remaining 90% of outcrops. The sedimentary pile is at most not more than 1200 metres thick. The Almesåkra Group is tectonically disturbed, shows considerable folding and is intruded by diabase. Almesåkra Group overlies the plutons of the Transscandinavian Igneous Belt. At least in some outcrops the lowermost sediments are arkoses, presumably of local origin as grus. Geologists Eva-Lena Tullborg and co-workers consider the Almesåkra Group as originating from first phases of erosion of the uplifted Sveconorwegian region to the west.

Near Brevik in Eksjö Municipality and Röjda, there are diabase dykes hosting numerous rounded clasts of red Jotnian sandstone including both quartz arenite and arkose. These Jotnian xenoliths are interpreted as having been part of a conglomerate that was disintegrated by the diabase magma. The conglomerate which contained the rounded Jotnian sedimentary rock clasts has only been deduced to exist and has not found in the proximity of the diabases in question.

==== Dalarna ====
The occurrence at Dalarna (Dala sandstone), with its 50 km x 150 km area, constitutes the largest region known to be covered at present with Jotnian sediments. The sandstone extends beyond Sweden's border into Hedmark in Norway where it is known as the "Trysil sandstone". At Idre drilling has revealed that the Dala sandstone extends beneath the Caledonian nappes. The Dala sandstone unconformably overlies the Transscandinavian Igneous Belt basement. The unconformity, believed to have been formed by subaerial erosion, was the surface of a peneplain at the time of deposition of the Dala sandstone. The peneplain landscape formed after protracted periods of erosion. Sedimentation of the Dala sandstone happened between 1650 and 1200 million years ago.

The maximum thickness of the sediments at Dalarna is 800 m. The lowermost sediments are conglomerates and breccias. Above this basal layer, sediments are mainly stratified red sandstone intercalated with shale and conglomerate. Among the sandstones there are greywacke sandstones and quartz-rich sandstones. A remarkable feature on the Dala sandstones is that delicate features like ripple marks, rain drop marks and mudcracks have survived in the sediments. The sandstones in Dalarna are of aeolian origin and represent ancient dunes and interdune sediments. The Dala sandstone has an imprint of low grade burial metamorphism of the pumpellyite type, meaning they must once have been buried beneath several kilometres of sediments. It is possible that the Dala sandstone was once connected to the Gulf of Bothnia by an epicontinental sea. The Dala sandstone constitute a part of broad north-south aligned syncline. Sedimentation at Dalarna happened apparently not in a graben or rift as is the case for most other Jotnian sediments.

==== Gävle ====
Onshore Jotnian sediments at Gävle (Gävle sandstone) have an estimated maximum thickness of 900 metres. Along with the Dala sandstone the Gävle sandstone has been subject to low grade burial metamorphism of the pumpellyite type, meaning they must once have been buried beneath several kilometres of sediments. Together with the Jotnian sediments of Nordingrå the Gävle sandstone share links with the Satakunta Jotnian rocks. Archaeological finds show that Gävle sandstone has been used as millstone in Lejstaån near Uppsala.

==== Lake Mälaren ====
Jotnian sandstone crops out around Södra Björkfjärden in Lake Mälaren. (Note: The Lake Mälaren sandstone appeared in geological maps first in 1862 when Alfred Elis Törnebohm showed it erroneously as being of Devonian age in his map of the Södertälje quadrangle.) Visible outcrops can be found in the locality of Rasta in western Ekerön island and several small islands and islets: Midsommar, Pingst, Gåsholmen, Gåsholmsskäret and Gåsholmshatten, the last three being part of a nature reserve. Jotnian sandstone also occurs at the bottom of Björkjärden and studies of glacial erratics suggest there is unexposed Jotnian sandstone to north of the Björkfjärden area, where the outcrops are vestiges of an eroded Precambrian meteorite crater, filled with Jotnian sediments. At Rasta, the basement below the sediments is made of granites and pegmatites of the Svecofennian orogeny.

==== Nordingrå ====
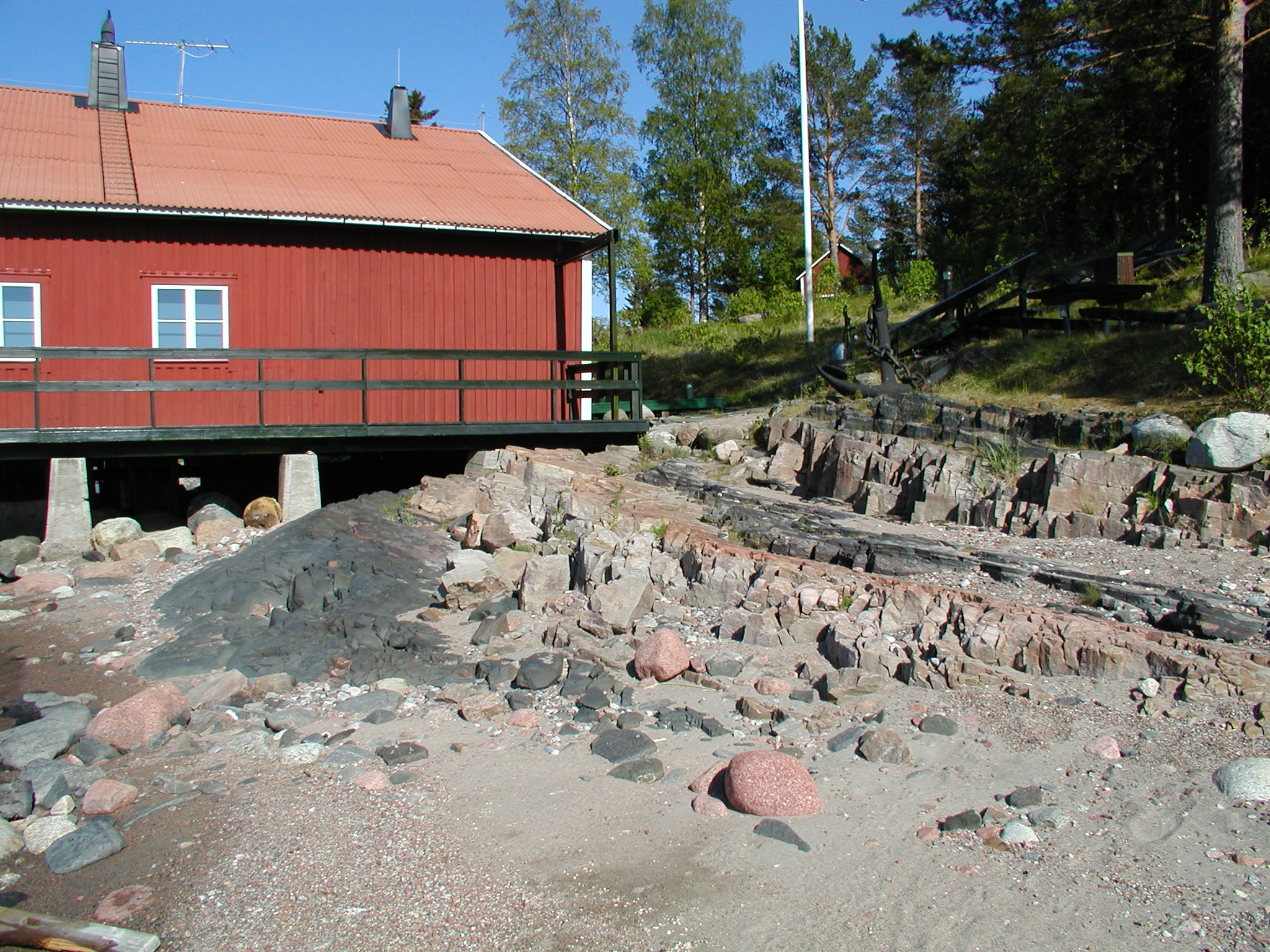
Red Jotnian sandstone at Trysunda, Trysunda Island. Note the black Postjotnian diabase sills.

In the Nordingrå area, spanning from Malmön to Hernön, Jotnian sediments rest on a complex of gabbros, monzogranite, granites and anorthosites. Jotnian sediments consist of quartz-rich sandstone, arkose and conglomerate. The sandstone and arkose have black and violet coloured siltstone and shale lenses and beds. Siltstone beds are commonly 5 to 10 centimetres thick. Jotnian sediments in the Nordingrå area display often cross-bedding and ripple marks. There are also fossil dunes. At Ringkallen the pile of Jotnian sediments is of 65 metres. Exposed sediment profiles show considerable variation in sedimentary facies. The deposition environment for sandstones including the arkose was one of an embankment or a channel with little current. The environment was likely one of a river as paleocurrents are somewhat uniform. It is also possible that some beds were deposited in tidal flats or as aeolianites. Similarly to the Gävle sandstones, the outcrops at Nordingrå are linked to the Satakunta outcrops in Finland. The sediments are both intruded and covered by diabase.

==== Tärnö ====
In the island of Tärnö Jotnian sandstone xenoliths have been found in a diabase dyke. These xenoliths have been interpreted as originating from Jotnian cover rocks lying above the dyke that have since been eroded. Once the dyke intruded, Jotnian rock fragments would have been incorporated into the dyke and then went down during a "reversal of magma ascent". The relationships of the dyke with Jotnian sediments suggest that magma intruded wet sediments as a sort of peperite.

=== Other occurrences ===
Jotnian sediments (mostly quartz sandstone and siltstone) exist at some locations beneath the Phanerozoic platform sediments of western Latvia and western Lithuania within the Baltic Syneclise.
