= Geologic province =

Spatial entity with common geologic attributes

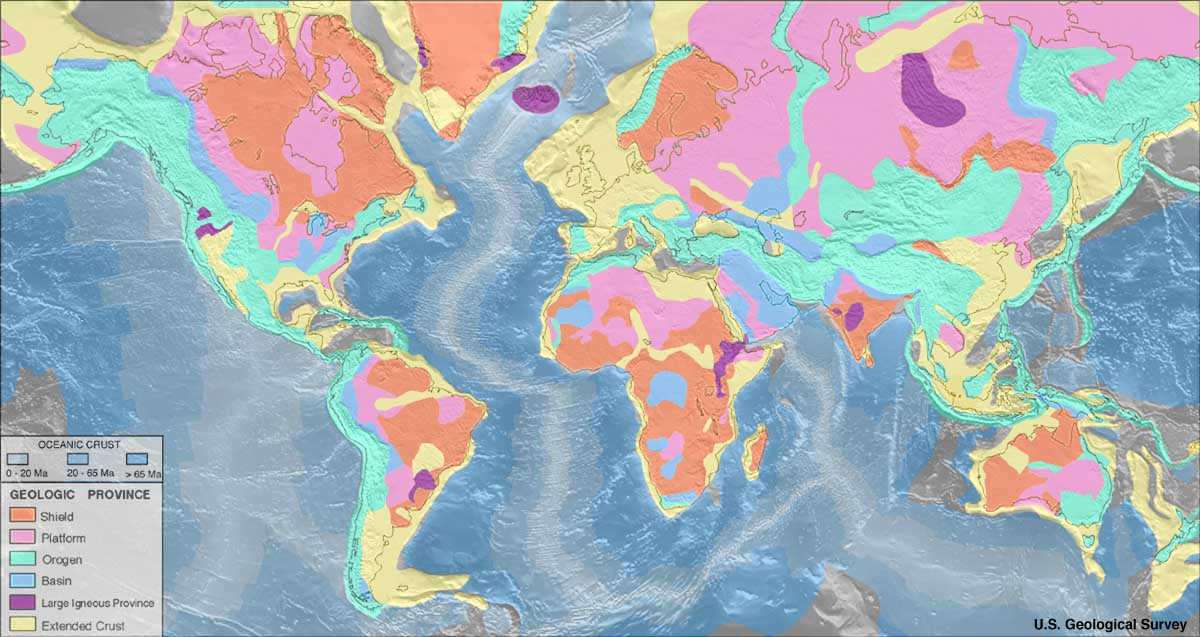
Geologic provinces of the world (USGS): Shield Platform Orogen Basin Large igneous province Extended crust / Oceanic crust: 0–20 Ma 20–65 Ma >65 Ma

A geologic province or geological province is a spatial entity with common geologic attributes. A province may include a single dominant structural element such as a basin or a fold belt, or a number of contiguous related elements. Adjoining provinces may be similar in structure but be considered separate due to differing histories.

== Geologic provinces by origin ==
Province	Definition	Subcategories	Examples
Shield	Exposed Precambrian crystalline igneous and metamorphic rocks that form tectonically stable areas		Arabian-Nubian Shield; Canadian Shield
Platform	Horizontal or gently-lying sedimentary strata covering a basement of igneous or metamorphic rocks	Carbonate platform	East European Platform
Orogen	Linear or arc-shaped formation where continental crust has been folded, deformed and uplifted to form mountain ranges	Island arc; Continental arc; Forearc	Laramide Orogeny; Andean Orogeny
Basin	Low-lying formation of rock strata formed by tectonic warping of previously horizontal strata	Cratonic basin; Foredeep basin; Sedimentary basin	Illinois Basin; Paraná Basin
Large igneous province	Accumulation of igneous rocks, including liquid rock (intrusive) or volcanic rock formations (extrusive)		North Atlantic Igneous Province; Columbia River Basalt Group
Extended crust	Continental crust thinned due to extensional strain	Passive margin; Rift	Basin and Range Province; Northern Cordilleran Volcanic Province

== Geologic provinces by resources ==
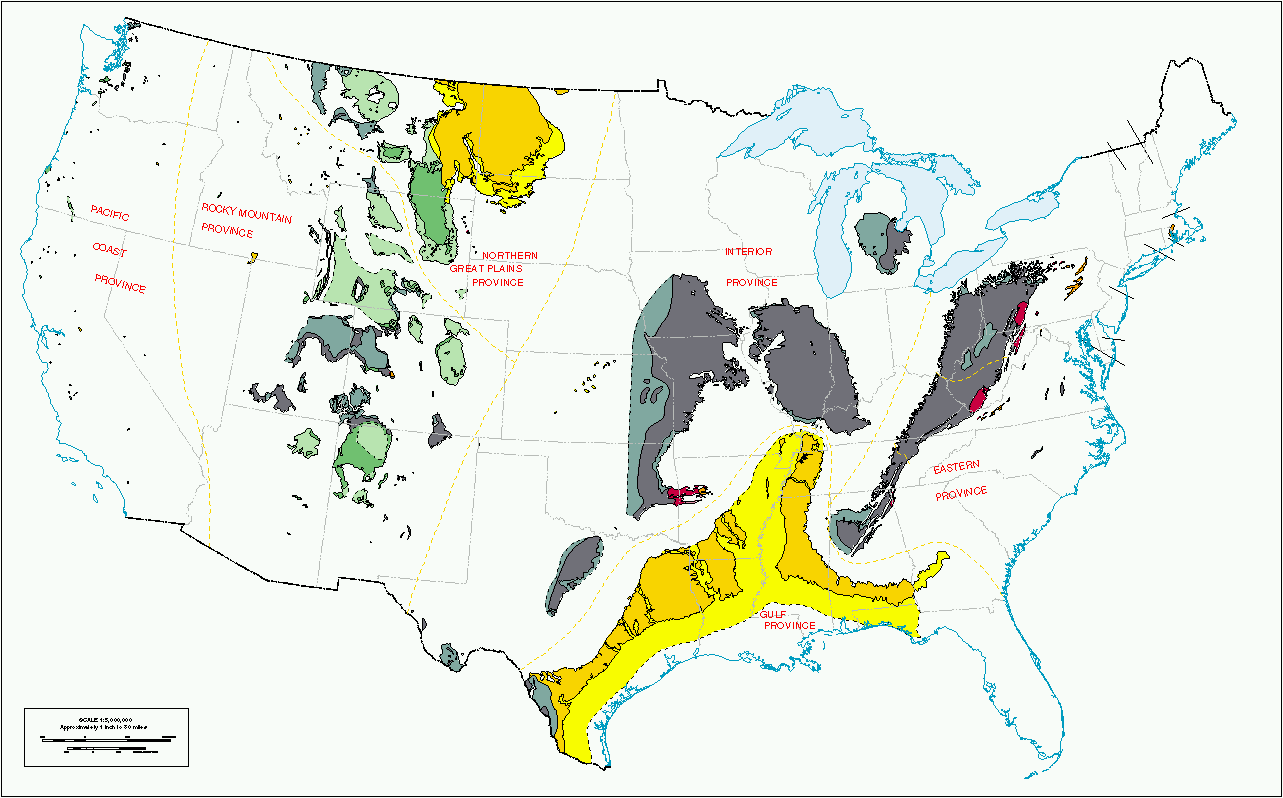
U.S. coal regions and provinces.

Some studies classify provinces based upon mineral resources, such as mineral deposits. There are a particularly large number of provinces identified worldwide for petroleum and other fossil fuels, such as the Niger Delta petroleum province.

== See also ==
- Geomorphology
- Physiographic province
- United States Geological Survey (USGS)
