= Hogland Series =

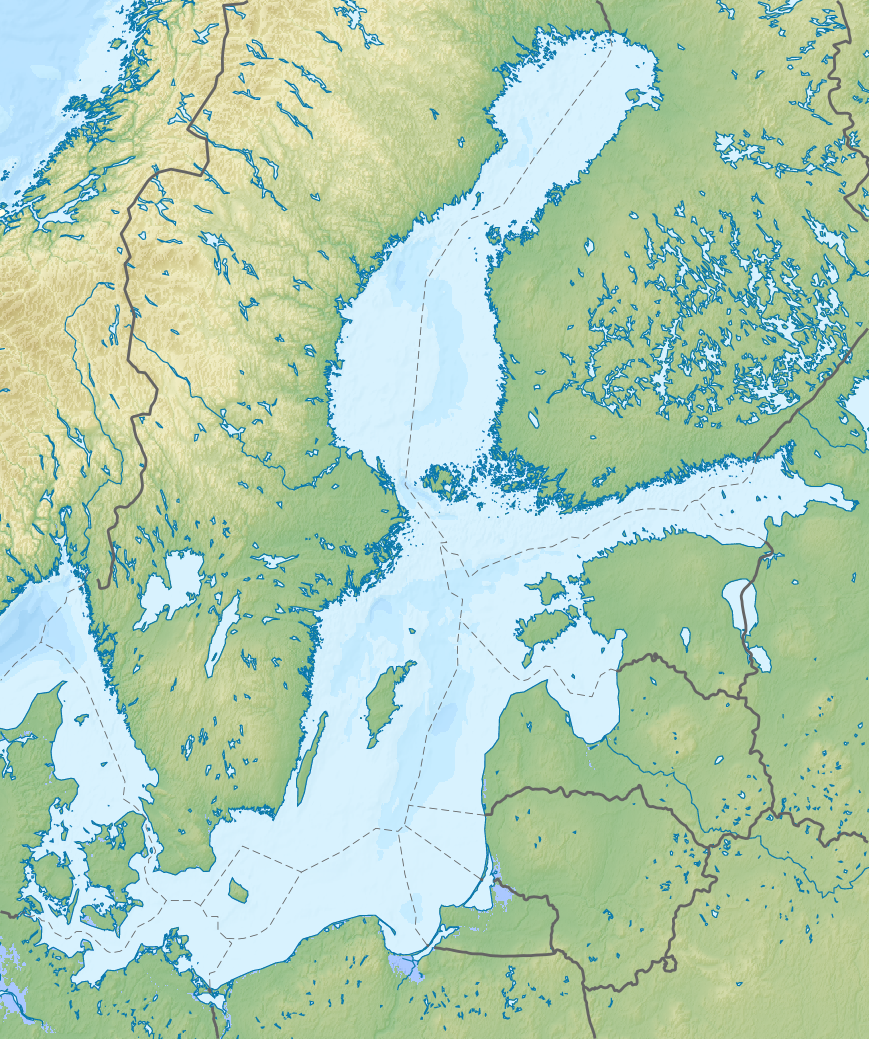
Location of Gogland within the Baltic Sea.

The Hogland Series are a series of Subjotnian sedimentary rocks exposed on the island of Gogland (Swedish: Hogland), the Sommer Islands and the nearby sea floor in the Gulf of Finland. The series encompass quartz-rich conglomerates and breccias, as well as some volcanic rocks of mafic composition in the form of lava flows and some more silica-rich igneous rocks including quartz-porphyry. The porphyries, which lie at the top the pile, share their origin with the rapakivi granites located nearby. An exhumed Subjotnian erosion surface is exposed on the island.
