= Orogenic belt =

Zone affected by mountain formation

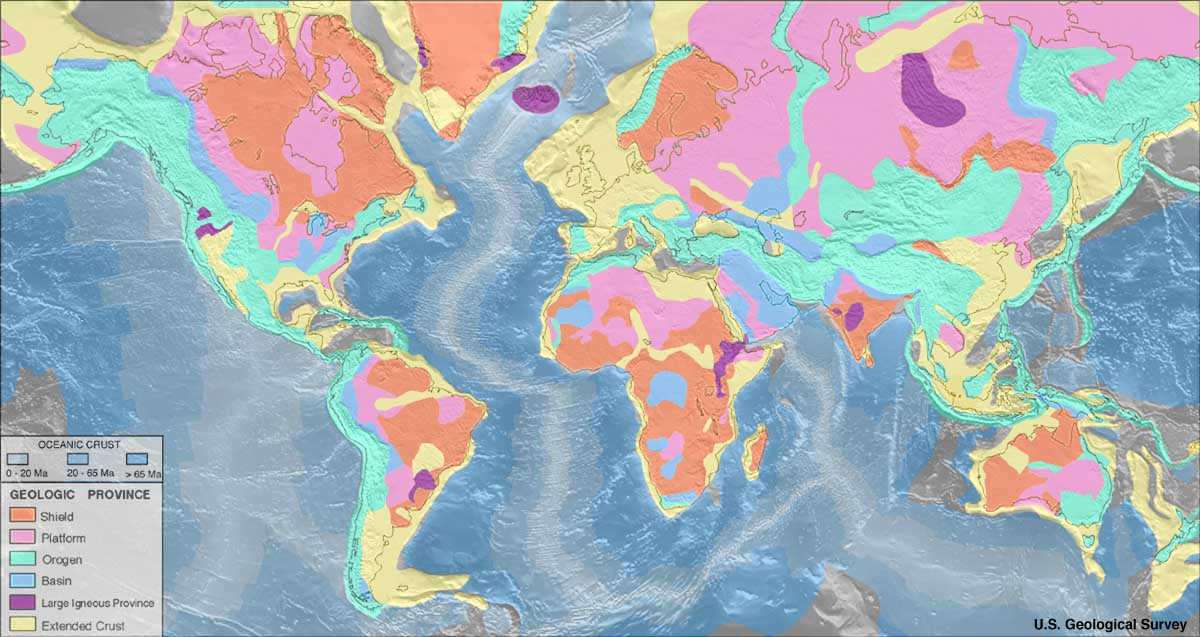
Geologic provinces of the world (USGS): Shield Platform Orogen Basin Large igneous province Extended crust / Oceanic crust: 0–20 Ma 20–65 Ma >65 Ma

An orogenic belt, orogen, or mobile belt (Note: The term mobile belt is sometimes preferred for orogenic belts to which plate-tectonic models cannot be applied as easily due to their age.) is a zone of Earth's crust affected by orogeny. An orogenic belt develops when a continental plate crumples and is uplifted to form one or more mountain ranges; this involves a series of geological processes collectively called orogenesis.

== Overview ==
Orogeny typically produces orogenic belts, which are elongated regions of deformation bordering continental cratons. Young orogenic belts, in which subduction is still taking place, are characterized by frequent volcanic activity and earthquakes. Older orogenic belts are typically deeply eroded to expose displaced and deformed strata. These are often highly metamorphosed and include vast bodies of intrusive igneous rock called batholiths.

Subduction of an oceanic plate beneath a continental plate to form an accretionary orogen. (example: the Andes)

Continental collision of two continental plates to form a collisional orogen. Typically, continental crust is subducted to lithospheric depths for blueschist to eclogite facies metamorphism, and then exhumed along the same subduction channel. (example: the Himalayas)

Orogenic belts are associated with subduction zones, which consume crust, thicken lithosphere, produce earthquake and volcanoes, and often build island arcs. These island arcs may be added to a continental margin during an accretionary orogeny. The orogeny may culminate with continental crust from the opposite side of the subducting oceanic plate arriving at the subduction zone. This ends subduction and transforms the accretional orogeny into a collisional orogeny. The collisional orogeny may produce extremely high mountains, as has been taking place in the Himalayas for the last 65 million years.

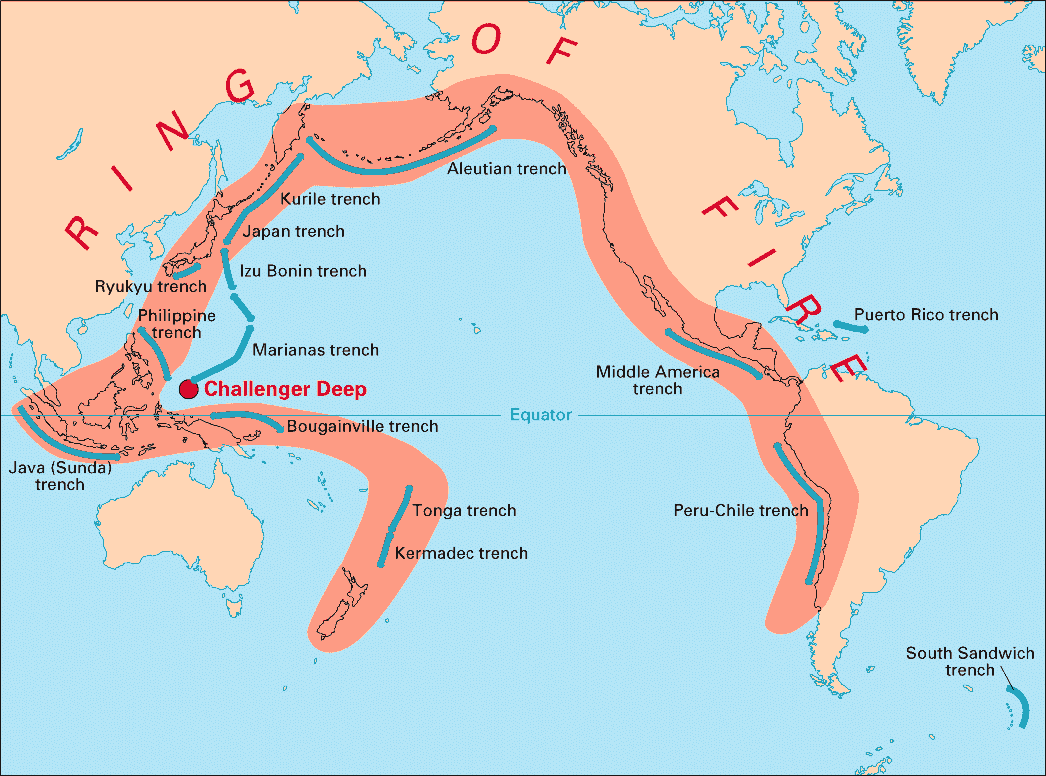
Circum-Pacific orogenic belt
(Pacific Ring of Fire)

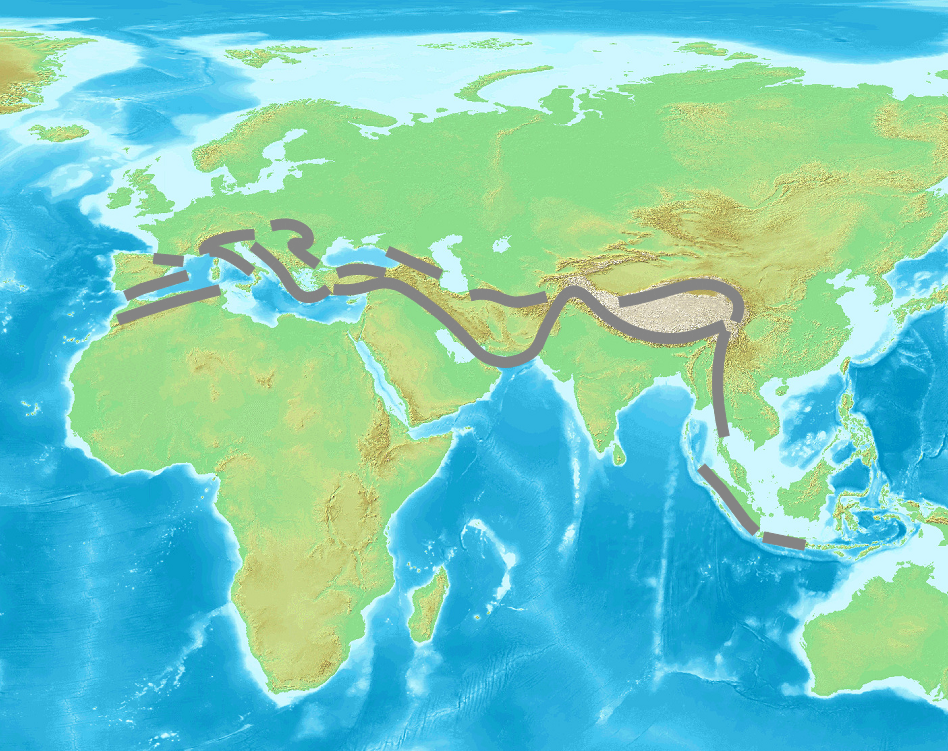
Alpine-Himalayan orogenic belt

Prominent orogenic belts on the Earth are the circum-Pacific orogenic belt (the Pacific Ring of Fire) and the Alpine-Himalayan orogenic belt. Since these orogenic belts are young, they form large mountain ranges; crustal activity is active and accompanied by volcanic belts and seismic belts.
