= East European Platform =

Geological feature in Eastern Europe

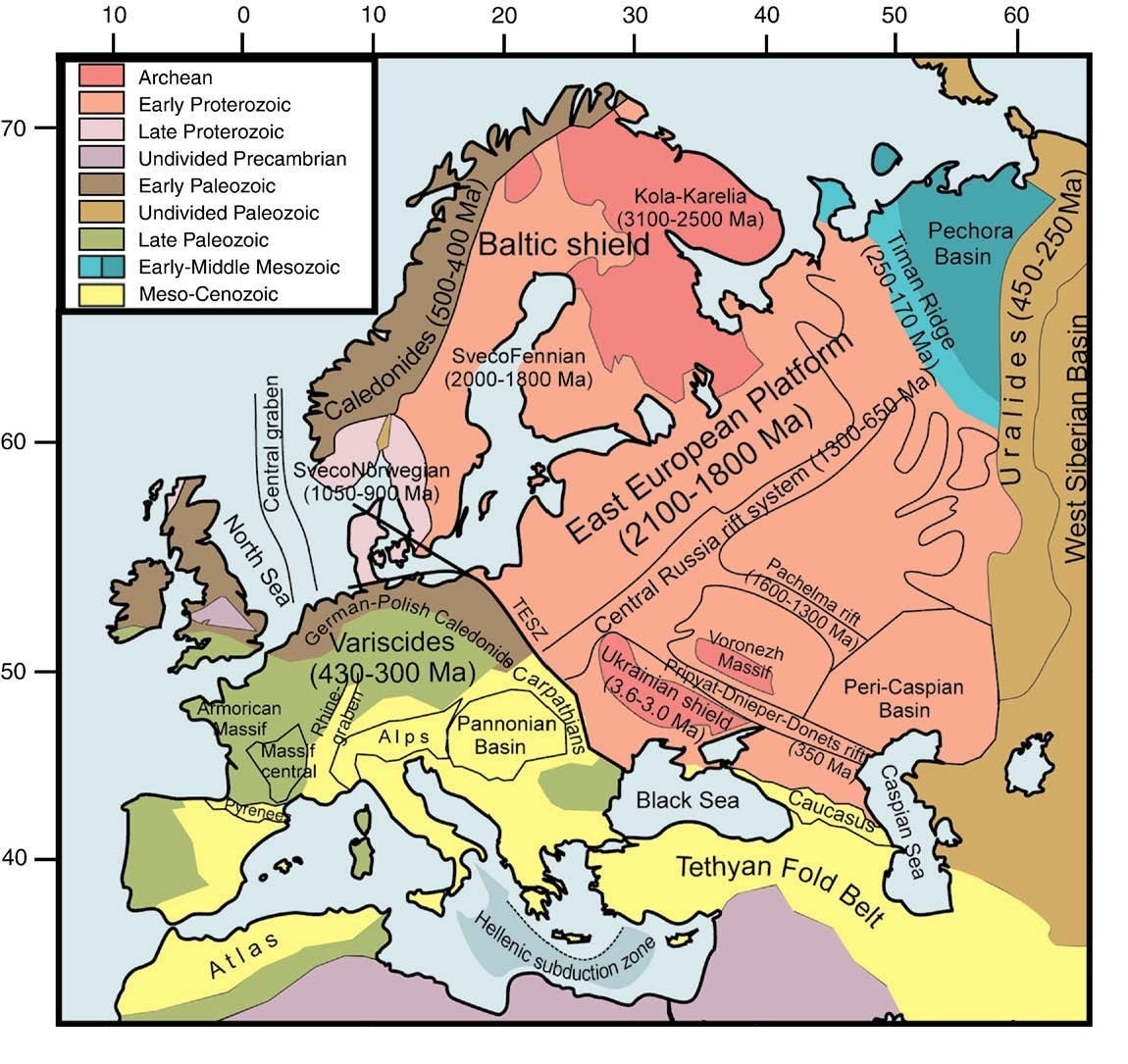
Simplified tectonics map of Europe, East European Platform in orange.

East European Platform or Russian Platform is a large and flat area of the East European Craton covered by sediments in Eastern Europe spanning from the Ural Mountains to the Tornquist Zone and from the Peri-Caspian Basin to the Barents Sea. Over geological time the platform area has experienced extension, inversion and compression. It has an area of about 6 million km^{2}. The East European Platform sediments can be classified into the following groups: a "protoplatform" of metamorphosed sediments at the bottom, a "quasiplatform" of slightly deformed sediments, a "cataplatform", and a "orthoplatform" at the top. The Mesoproterozoic Jotnian sediments of the Baltic area are examples of a "quasiplatform". The oldest preserved continuous sedimentary cover in the platform date to the Vendian about 650 million years ago. The cycles of deposition of platform sediments are related to the development of nearby orogenies like the Timanide orogeny, the Uralian orogeny, the Hercynian orogeny and the Caledonian orogeny.

The platform hosts numerous ancient rifts or aulacogens some of which date to the Riphean of the Proterozoic. In the Late Devonian rifting and magmatic activity occurred within the platform leading to the formation of the Dnieper-Donets Rift. This event was possibly caused by a cluster of mantle plumes.
