= Arvid Högbom =

Swedish geologist (1857–1940)

Arvid Gustaf Högbom
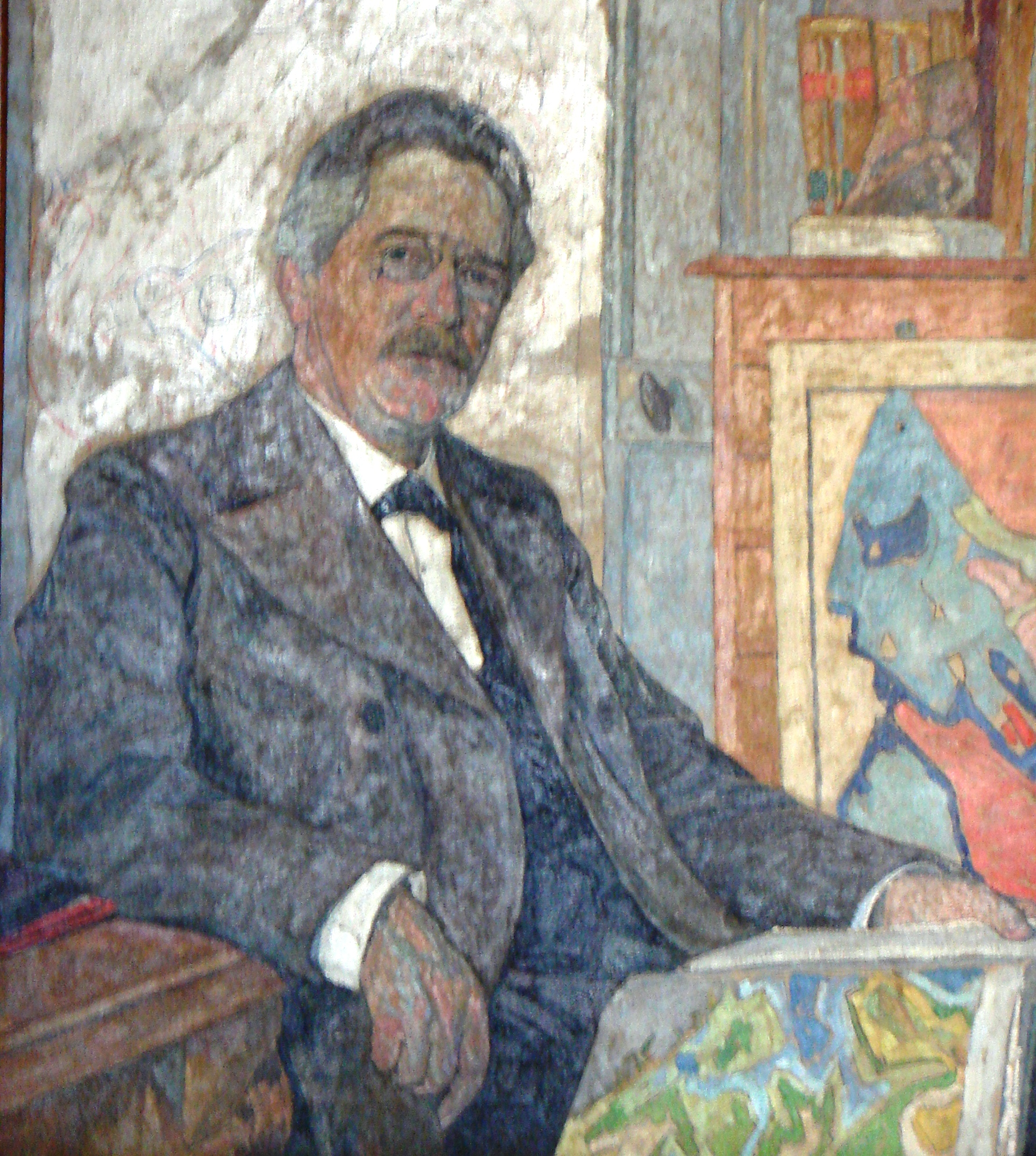
- Arvid Gustaf Högbom by Carl Wilhelm Wilhelmson (1928)
- Born: 11 January 1857; Vännäs, Sweden
- Died: 19 January 1940 (aged 83); Uppsala, Sweden
- Citizenship: Sweden
- Education: Uppsala University
- Known for: Sub-Cambrian peneplain Subjotnian; Study of carbon cycle
- Awards: Björkénska priset (1907)
- Scientific career
- Fields: Geology
- Workplaces: Uppsala University

Arvid Gustaf Högbom (1857–1940) was a Swedish geologist. He was a professor of mineralogy and geology at Uppsala University.

== Biography ==
Arvid Högbom was born at Vännäs in Västerbotten County, Sweden. Högbom was a student at Uppsala University earning a Bachelor of Philosophy in 1880 and a Licentiate in philosophy in 1884. In 1885, he defended his doctorate thesis; Iakttagelser rörande Jemtlands glaciala geologi med inledande öfversigt af berggrunden (Stockholm. 1885).

He was appointed lecturer at Uppsala in 1885. In 1891 he joined the staff of the Stockholm University, but returned to Uppsala University in 1896 as professor of geology and mineralogy, occupying the chair until his retirement in 1922.

He became a member of the Royal Society of Sciences in Uppsala in 1898, of the Royal Swedish Academy of Agriculture and Forestry in 1913 and of the Royal Society of Arts and Sciences in Gothenburg in 1921. He became a member of the Royal Swedish Academy of Sciences in 1905 and Royal Physiographic Society in Lund in 1920.

Högbom became known as a geologist with magmatic differentiation, which he studied in the iron ore area of Gällivare in Norrbotten County. Högbom was the first to identify the Sub-Cambrian peneplain in a 1910 publication.

He coined the term Subjotnian in 1910. Högbomite (later renamed to magnesiohögbomite-2N2S), högbomite group, högbomite supergroup was named in his honour.

He is credited with having made the first ever estimate of the amount of carbon dioxide emitted into the atmosphere from the combustion of fossil fuels.

== See also ==
- History of climate change science

== Selected works ==
- Glaciala och petrografiska iakttagelser i Jämtlands län (1885)
- Vägledning vid geologiska exkursioner i Upsala omgifningar (1891)
- Om postarkeiska eruptiver i det svensk-finska urberget (1893)
- Geologisk beskrifning öfver Jämtlands län (1894)
- Om Ragundadalens geologi (1899)
- Sur la tectonique et l’orographie de la Scandinavie (1902)
- Studien in nordschwedischen Drumlinslandschaften (1905)
