= Shield (geology) =

Large stable area of exposed ancient basement rock

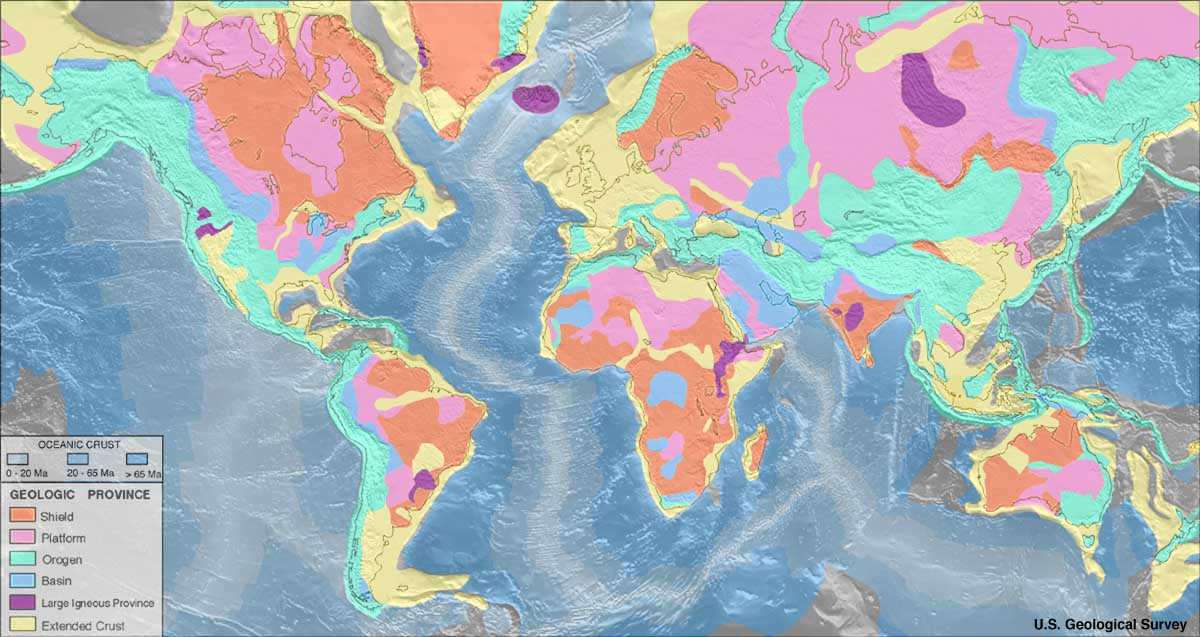
Geologic provinces of the world (USGS) Shield Platform Orogen Basin Large igneous province Extended crust Oceanic crust: 0–20 Ma 20–65 Ma >65 Ma

A shield (also continental shield) is a large area of exposed, geologically stable igneous or metamorphic basement rocks. These rocks are generally Precambrian and sometimes 2 to 3 billion years old.. Together with platforms, where the basement rock is covered with younger sedimentary layers, shields form parts of cratons.

== Terminology ==
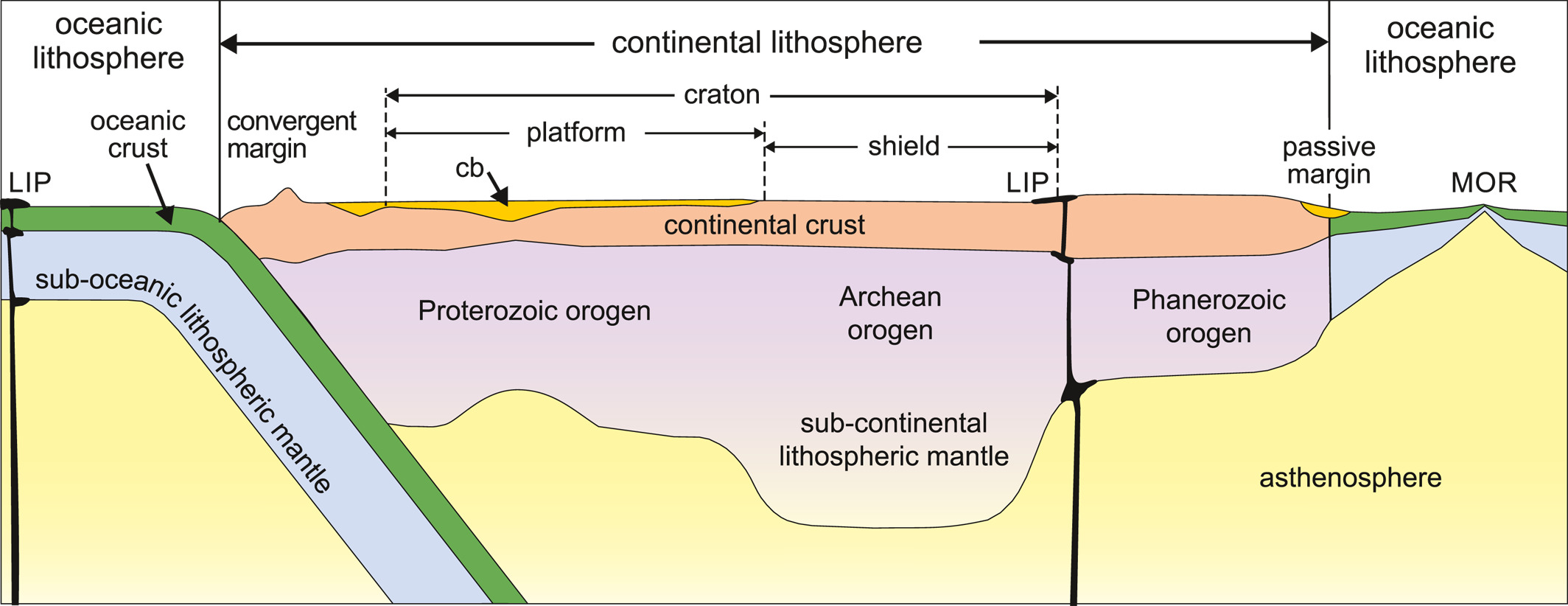
Idealized cross-section of Earth's lithosphere, including the relationship between cratons, shields and platforms (Abbreviations: cb=cratonic basin, LIP=large igneous province, MOR=mid-ocean ridge)

While the term craton refers generally to regions of continental crust with ancient, geologically stable basement rock, shield only refers to those parts of a craton where the (igneous and/or metamorphic) basement does not have a sedimentary cover.

The term shield, used to describe this type of geographic region, appears in the 1901 English translation of Eduard Suess's Face of Earth by H. B. C. Sollas, and comes from the shape "not unlike a flat shield" of the Canadian Shield which has an outline that "suggests the shape of the shields carried by soldiers in the days of hand-to-hand combat."

== Lithology ==
It is estimated that over 50% of Earth's shields surface is made up of gneiss.

== Erosion and landforms ==
Being relatively stable regions, the relief of shields is rather old, with elements such as peneplains being shaped in Precambrian times. The oldest peneplain identifiable in a shield is called a "primary peneplain"; in the case of the Fennoscandian Shield, this is the Sub-Cambrian peneplain.

The landforms and shallow deposits of northern shields that have been subject to Quaternary glaciation and periglaciation are distinct from those found closer to the equator. Shield relief, including peneplains, can be protected from erosion by various means. Shield surfaces exposed to sub-tropical and tropical climate for long enough time can end up being silicified, becoming hard and extremely difficult to erode. Erosion of peneplains by glaciers in shield regions is limited. In the Fennoscandian Shield, average glacier erosion during the Quaternary has amounted to tens of meters, though this was not evenly distributed. For glacier erosion to be effective in shields, a long "preparation period" of weathering under non-glacial conditions may be a requirement.

In weathered and eroded shields, inselbergs are common sights.

== List of shields ==
- The African (Ethiopian) Shield is located in Africa.
- The Angaran Shield,
- The Antarctic Shield.
- The Amazonian (Brazilian) Shield
- The Guiana Shield
- The Platian Shield
- The Arabian-Nubian Shield
- The Atlantic Shield
- The Australian Shield
- The Baltic (Fennoscandian) Shield
- The Canadian Shield.
- The China-Korean Shield is located in China and North Korea
- The Indian Shield occupies two-thirds of the southern Indian peninsula.
- The Tuareg Shield is located in northern Africa, primarily within southern Algeria, northern Mali, and western Niger.
- The Uruguayan Shield

== See also ==
- Basement (geology)
- Craton
- Platform (geology)
