= Riphean age =

Stage in the geological timescale named after the Urals

Riphean
- 1600 – 600 Ma

Usage information
- Celestial body: Earth
- Regional usage: Regional
- Time scale(s) used: Siberian
- Used by: Russia

Definition
- Chronological unit: Age
- Stratigraphic unit: Stage

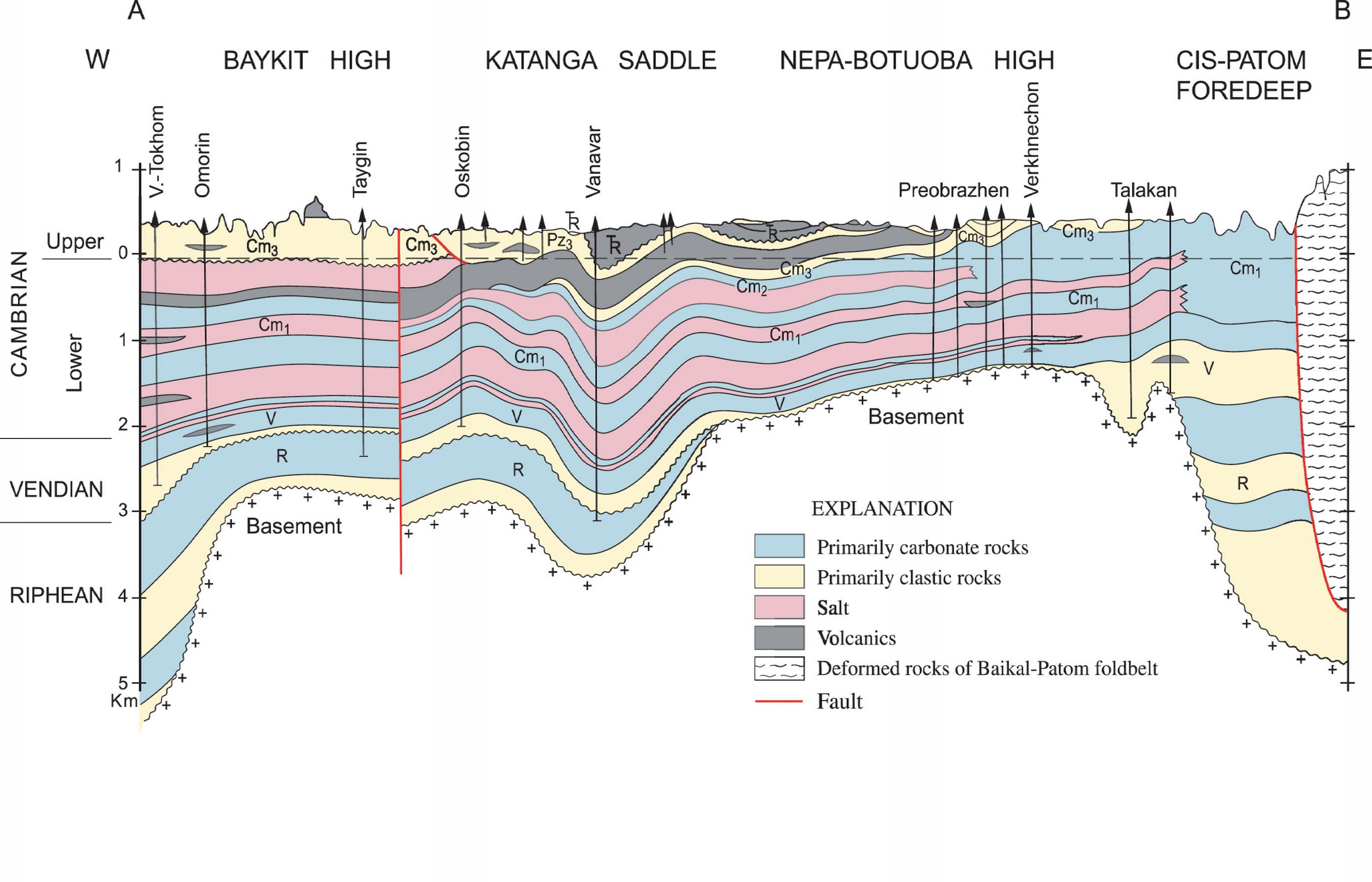
Geological cross-section of southern Siberia, showing Riphean rocks buried under at least 2 km of younger rocks

The Riphean is a stage or age of the geologic timescale from 1,600 to 600 million years ago. The name Riphean is used in the Proterozoic stratigraphy of Russia and the Fennoscandian Shield in Finland. It was also used in a number of older international geologic timescales but, in the most recent timescales of the ICS, it is replaced by the Calymmian, Ectasian, Stenian, Tonian and Cryogenian periods of the Neoproterozoic and Mesoproterozoic eras.

During the Riphean, there was a great increase in stromatolite diversity, possibly related to the appearance of eukaryotes.

The word 'Riphean' comes from the ancient name "Riphean Mountains", sometimes identified with the Ural Mountains.

The Riphean has been divided by geologists into the Early Riphean (1600–1400 Ma), Middle Riphean (1400–1000 Ma) and Late Riphean (1000–600 Ma) subdivisions.

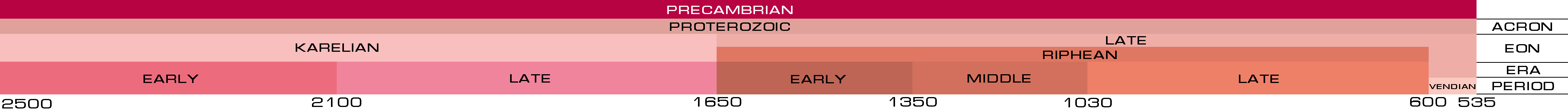
Russian timescale for Proterozoic. Riphean and its subdivisions are in brown.

== See also ==
- Jotnian
