= Structural basin =

Large-scale structural geological depression formed by tectonic warping

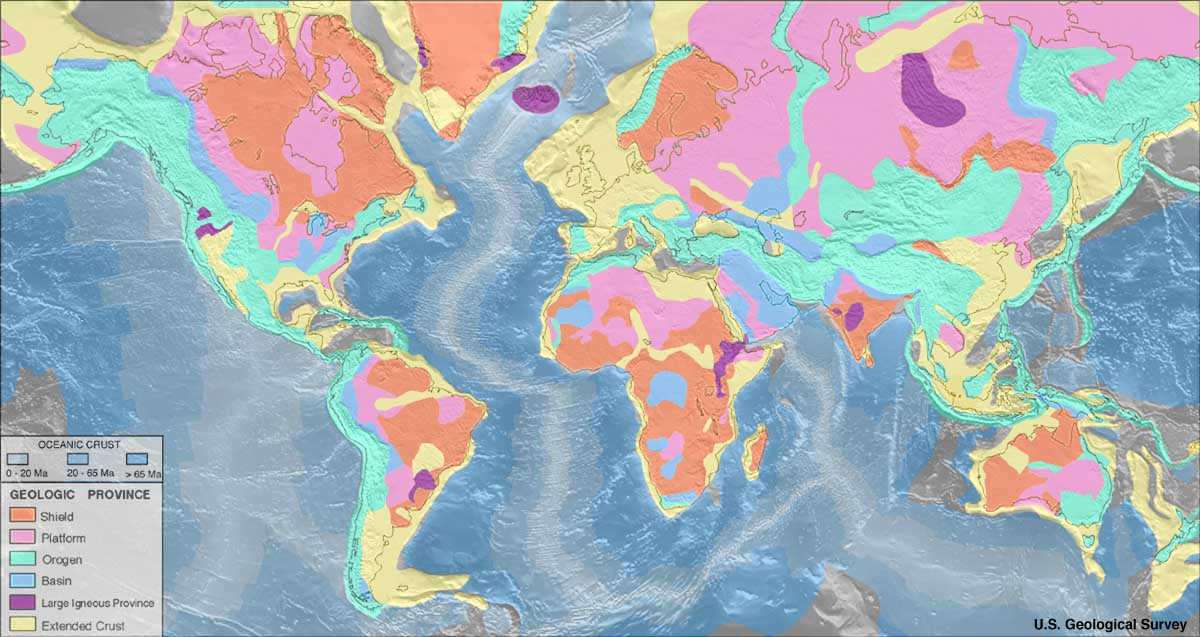
Geologic provinces of the world (USGS) Shield Platform Orogen Basin Large igneous province Extended crust Oceanic crust: 0–20 Ma 20–65 Ma >65 Ma

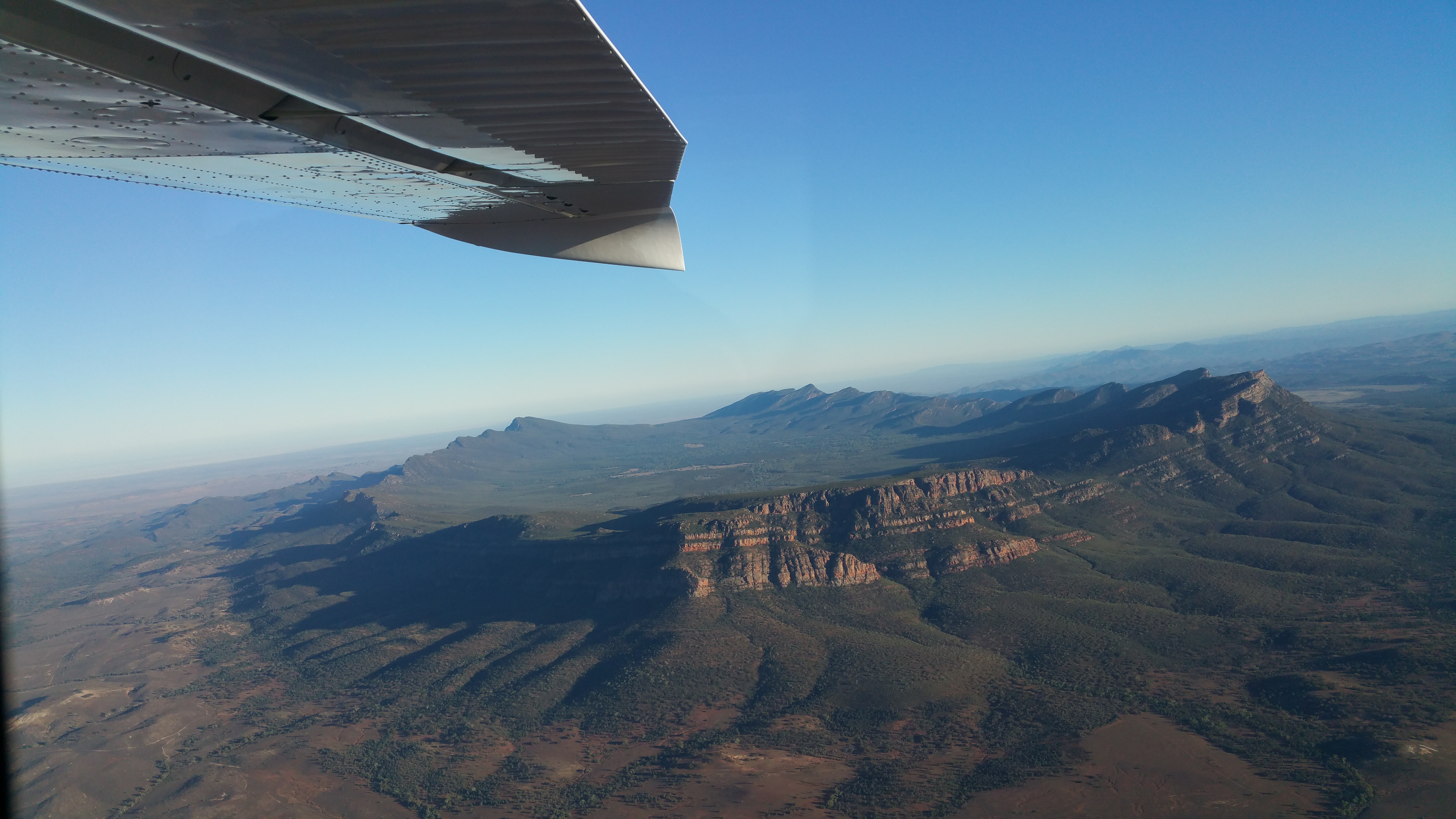
Wilpena Pound structural basin in South Australia

A structural basin is a large-scale structural formation of rock strata formed by tectonic warping (folding) of previously flat-lying strata into a syncline fold. They are geological depressions, the inverse of domes. Elongated structural basins are a type of geological trough. Some structural basins are sedimentary basins, aggregations of sediment that filled up a depression or accumulated in an area; others were formed by tectonic events long after the sedimentary layers were deposited.

Basins may appear on a geologic map as roughly circular or elliptical, with concentric layers. Because the strata dip toward the center, the exposed strata in a basin are progressively younger from the outside in, with the youngest rocks in the center. Basins are often large in areal extent, often hundreds of kilometers across.

Structural basins are often important sources of coal, petroleum, and groundwater.

== Examples ==
=== Europe ===
- Hampshire Basin, United Kingdom
- London Basin, United Kingdom
- Paris Basin, France
- Permian Basin, Poland, northern Germany, Denmark, the Netherlands, the North Sea, and Scotland
- Turgay Basin, Kazakhstan

=== North America ===
==== Canada ====
- Hudson Bay

==== Trinidad and Tobago ====
- Southern Basin, Trinidad

==== United States ====
- Albuquerque Basin, New Mexico
- Appalachian Basin, Eastern United States
- Big Horn Basin, Wyoming
- Black Warrior Basin, Alabama and Mississippi
- Delaware Basin, Texas and New Mexico
- Denver Basin, Colorado
- Illinois Basin, Illinois
- Los Angeles Basin, California
- Michigan Basin, Michigan
- North Park Colorado Basin
- Paradox Basin, Utah and Colorado
- Permian Basin, Texas and New Mexico
- Piceance Basin, Colorado
- Powder River Basin, Wyoming and Montana
- Raton Basin, Colorado and New Mexico
- Sacramento Basin, California
- San Juan Basin, New Mexico and Colorado
- Uinta Basin, Utah
- Williston Basin, Montana and North Dakota
- Wind River Basin, Wyoming

=== Oceania ===
==== Australia ====
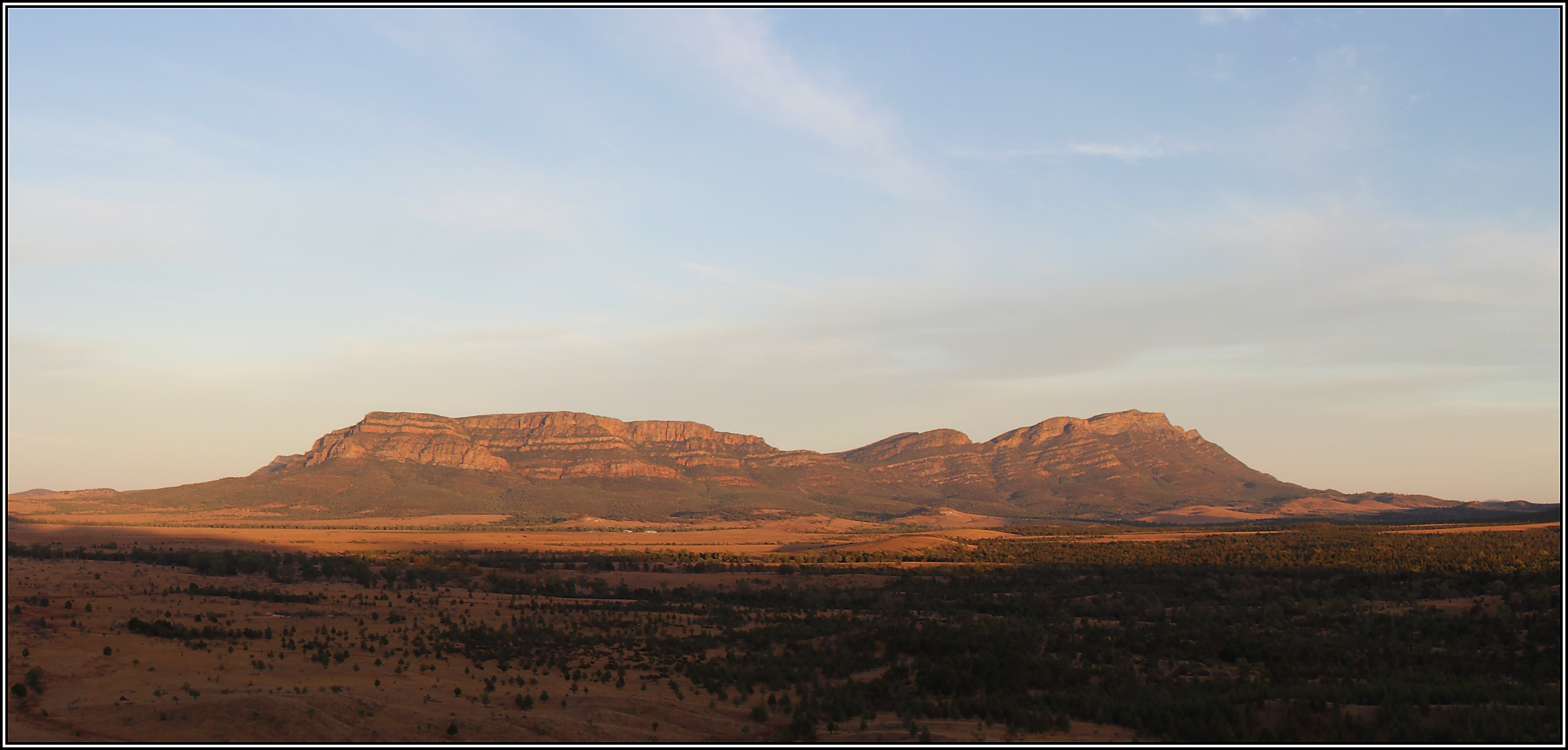
Wilpena Pound structural basin

- Amadeus Basin
- Bowen Basin
- Cooper Basin
- Galilee Basin
- Great Artesian Basin
- Wilpena Pound

=== South America ===
- Chaco Basin, Argentina, Bolivia and Paraguay
- Magallanes Basin, Chile
- Neuquén Basin, Argentina and Chile
- Paraná Basin, Argentina, Brazil, Paraguay and Uruguay
- Llanos Basin, Colombia

== See also ==
- Drainage basin
- Fold belt
