= Geology of the Baltic Sea =

The geology of the Baltic Sea is characterized by having areas located both at the Baltic Shield of the East European Craton and in the Danish-North German-Polish Caledonides. Historical geologists make a distinction between the current Baltic Sea depression, formed in the Cenozoic era, and the much older sedimentary basins whose sediments are preserved in the zone. Although glacial erosion has contributed to shape the present depression, the Baltic trough is largely a depression of tectonic origin that existed long before the Quaternary glaciation.

== Ancient sedimentary basin ==
=== Tectonic evolution ===
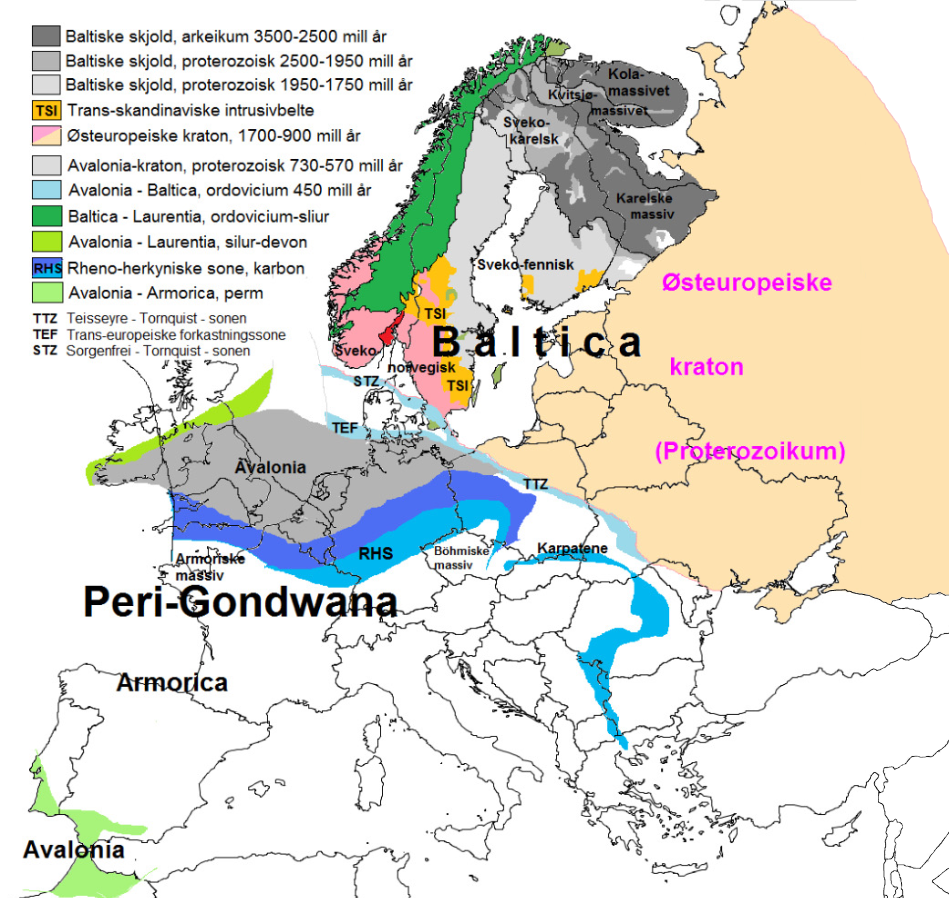
Geological map of the Baltic Sea area. The ancient continent of Baltica is shown, as is the East European Craton a constituent of it.

The Baltic Sea sedimentary basin was formed on top of the East European Craton millions of years after it consolidated.

This occurred during the Late Ediacaran and the Early Cambrian when the weakest part of the craton was reactivated. Since then the basin has been deepened mainly through subsidence caused by extensional tectonics. In the northern part of the Baltic Sea basin, including the Gulf of Bothnia and the Bothnian Sea, the depression originated as a series of interconnected rifts that were not active enough to split the East European Craton. Subsidence in the southern parts was most pronounced during a period starting in the Late Ordovician and lasting to Middle Silurian. At this time the Baltic sea basin and the East European Craton were part of a continent and tectonic plate known as Baltica. Baltica collided with the continent Laurentia in the Late Silurian and Early Devonian. This caused compression in the basin in a north-west to south-east direction.

This collision further led to the formation of a fold and thrust belt and faults north of the Danish–North German–Polish Caledonides. During the Carboniferous and Permian the basin areas around Rügen and northern Poland were subject to the intrusion of magma. After the Permian there was little tectonic activity in the Baltic for most of the Mesozoic until the Cretaceous. During the Cretaceous a tectonic inversion occurred in the southwestern part of the basin.

=== Sedimentary fill ===
The oldest sedimentary rocks in the Baltic Sea area that are not metamorphosed are Jotnian orthoquartzite, siltstones and conglomerates. Jotnian sediments are scattered. In the south and east of the Baltic crystalline shield the rocks are overlain by an extensive sedimentary cover that constitutes part of the East European platform. In the Baltic area of the platform there are sedimentary units of all geological periods from the Ediacaran (Vendian) to the Cenozoic. Paleogene and Neogene marine sediments are however absent in the whole Baltic area except for the southern fringes.

== Origin and shape of modern depression ==
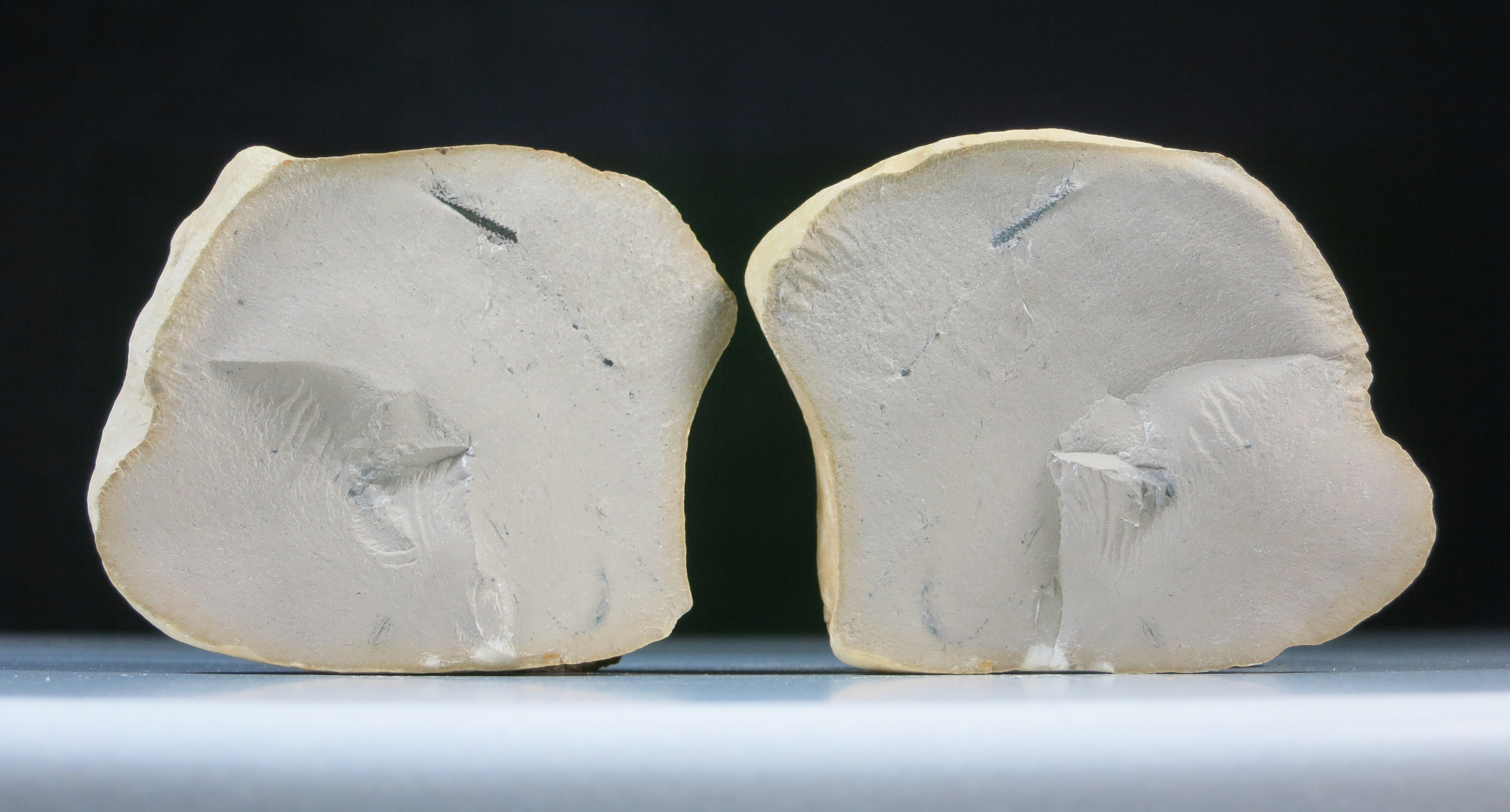
Ordovician limestone from the floor of the Baltic Sea, just south of Åland, that was transported by an ice sheet during the last ice age and deposited in north-east Germany as a glacial erratic

Scientists do not agree on the formation process of the present Baltic Sea depression. Scholars like Voipio (1981) and Šlaiupa (1995) consider the depression to have been formed in the Cenozoic, before the Quaternary, by tectonic processes. Some others like Marks (2004) stress erosion was key to the formation of the depression.

In the Cenozoic, long before the Quaternary glaciations the Baltic was the site of a large river called Eridanos. This river drained westward towards the North Sea. The Neogene uplift of the South Swedish Dome deflected Eridanos river from its original path across south-central Sweden into a course south of Sweden in the Pliocene.

Glacial erosion has superficially scoured an elongated area of the Baltic spanning from northern Småland, via Stockholm and Åland to the coast at the Finnish-Russian border. The scoured area and other zones made up of crystalline Fennoscandian Shield rocks (northern and western Baltic Sea) have experienced overall very limited glacial erosion during the Quaternary. Bathymetry of linear depressions in the Baltic seabed shows that the depression has been subject to glacial overdeepening. The date during which glacier ice carved these troughs is not known but it could have happened during the first glaciations that affected the Baltic region. Alternatively overdeepening could have built-up gradually during the successive glaciations that affected the area.

== Quaternary seas and lakes ==
The hydrology, extent and nature of the Baltic Sea has varied considerably through the Quaternary. Its great overturns are linked to its geographic position, in particular its high latitude, that has made it prone to glaciations. During many Quaternary glaciations the whole depression was repeatedly covered by ice sheets. These glaciation have influenced the Baltic Sea depression by bringing eroded sediments from adjacent areas to the depression, downwarping the lithosphere during glaciations and causing isostatic rebound after thinning and retreat. Important to the understanding of the Baltic basin during the Quaternary was its connection to the open ocean in the west through the area of Denmark and Scania. The depth of the connection in particular has been critical to shape oceanographic conditions such as salinity.

=== Eemian and Weichselian ===
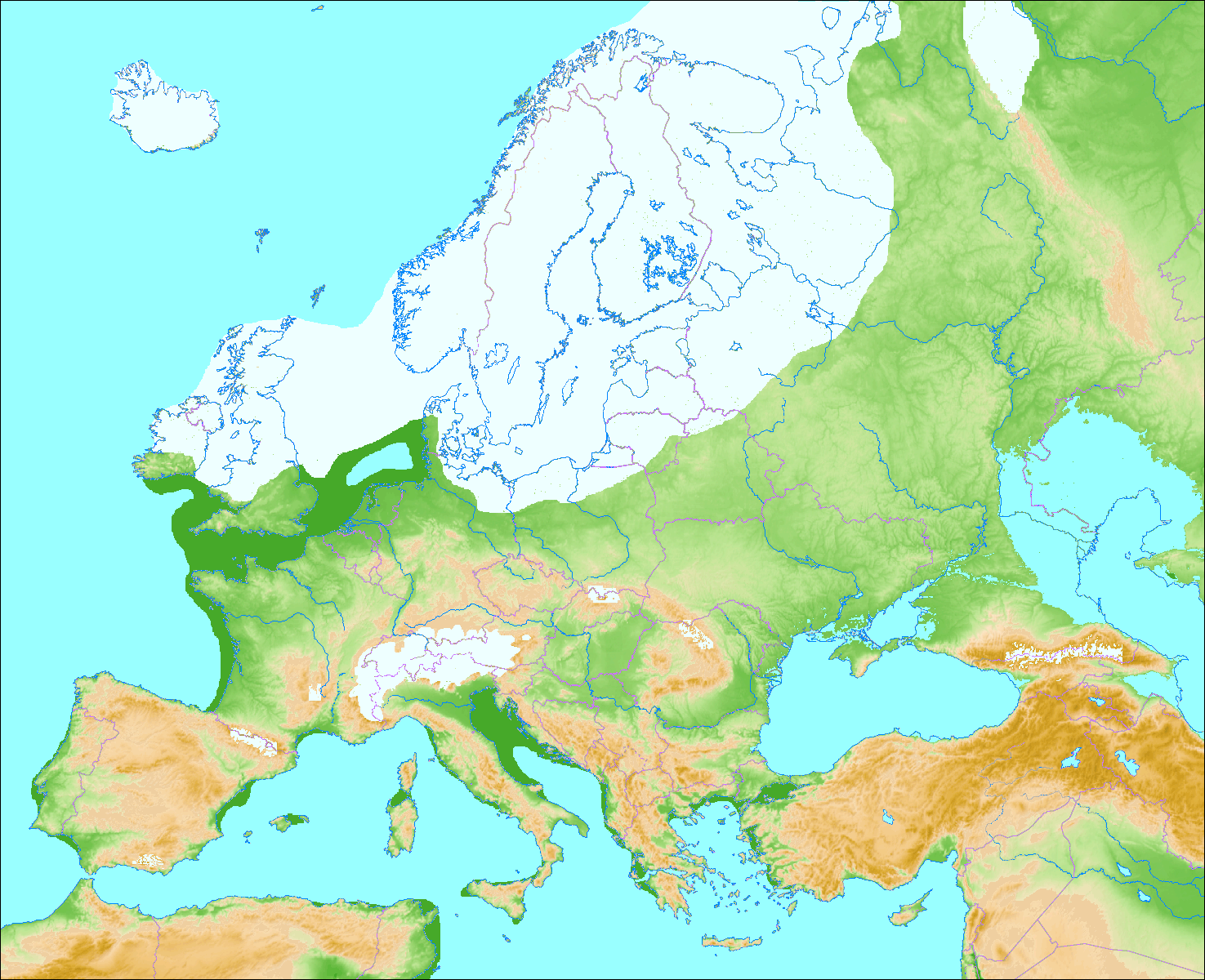
Europe and the Baltic area during the Weichselian glaciation at the time the ice sheet was at its maximum extent ca. 20,000 years ago.

When the Eemian interglacial began about 130 thousand years ago, the formerly ice-filled Baltic depression turned to a freshwater lake for a "brief" time of 300 years before becoming a more saline sea. This sea was during its first 2500 to 2000 years of existence connected to the White Sea through Karelia due to the isostatic depression caused by the ice sheet of the earlier Saalian ice age.

Little is known about the Baltic Sea during the oscillations of the Weichselian ice age, the last glaciation. The first Weichselian glaciations, corresponding to MIS 5b and 5d, penetrated parts of the Baltic Sea depression from north to south but did not got south beyond Åland. The Weichsel ice sheet reached northern Denmark about 65–60 thousand years ago.

=== Holocene ===
When the last ice sheet began to retreat north from the Baltic Sea depression in the early Holocene (ca. 10,000 years ago) glacier meltwater accumulated between the front of the ice sheet and the southern shores that were free of glacier ice. This accumulation of freshwater constituted a lake known as the Baltic Ice Lake. This lake did not mix with seawater from the west because the ground on the whole depression rose faster than sea level did. Eventually mixing and connection to the ocean did occur when the glacier front retreated to the north beyond Billingen about 11,500 years ago. The Baltic Ice Lake drained then rapidly reaching sea level. From this point on the Baltic water body became the Yoldia Sea. About 10,700 years ago the continued land rise separated the Baltic water body from the ocean again and Yoldia Sea turned into the Ancylus Lake. This lake lasted until 10,000 years before present when a new connection to the ocean was established, this time in the Danish Straits forming the Littorina Sea. Land rise did not close off Littorina sea but it made its connection the ocean over time more shallow allowing less salt water to enter it, thus gradually it evolved into the current Baltic Sea with somewhat brackish water.

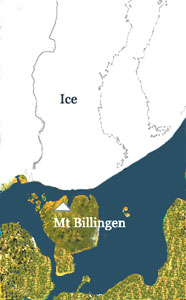
Approximate reconstruction of the Baltic Ice Lake

Ancylus Lake about 9500–8000 years ago

Littorina Sea about 7000 years ago

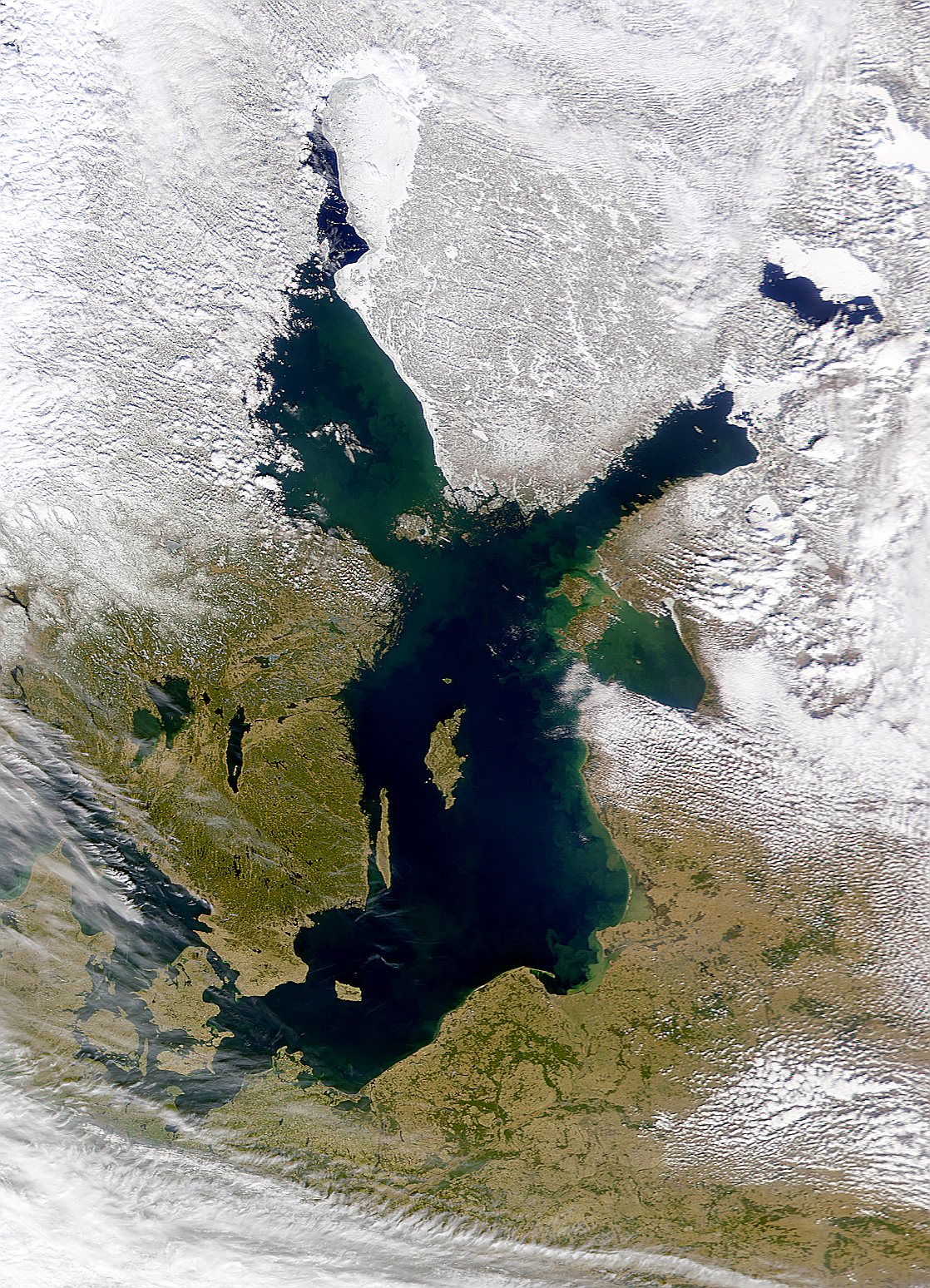
Baltic Sea within its present conditions

== Economic geology ==
=== Hydrocarbons ===
There are two kinds of oil shale in Estonia, both of which are sedimentary rocks laid down during the Ordovician geologic period. Graptolitic argillite is the larger resource, but, because its organic matter content is relatively low, it is not used industrially. The other one is kukersite, which has been mined for almost a hundred years and is expected to last for another 25–30 years. By the end of 2012, the total kukersite resource was 4.8 billion tonnes, of which up to 650 million tonnes was recoverable. Kukersite deposits in Estonia account for 1.1% of global oil shale deposits.

Exploratory wells have revealed the existence of petroleum of Lower Paleozoic age beneath Gotland.

== Baltic Sea anomaly ==
The "Baltic Sea anomaly" is a feature on an indistinct sonar image taken by Swedish salvage divers on the floor of the northern Baltic Sea in June 2011. The treasure hunters suggested the image showed an object with unusual features of seemingly extraordinary origin. Speculation published in tabloid newspapers claimed that the object was a sunken UFO. A consensus of experts and scientists say that the image most likely shows a natural geological formation.
