= Mesoproterozoic =

Second era of the Proterozoic Eon

- 1600 – 1000 Ma
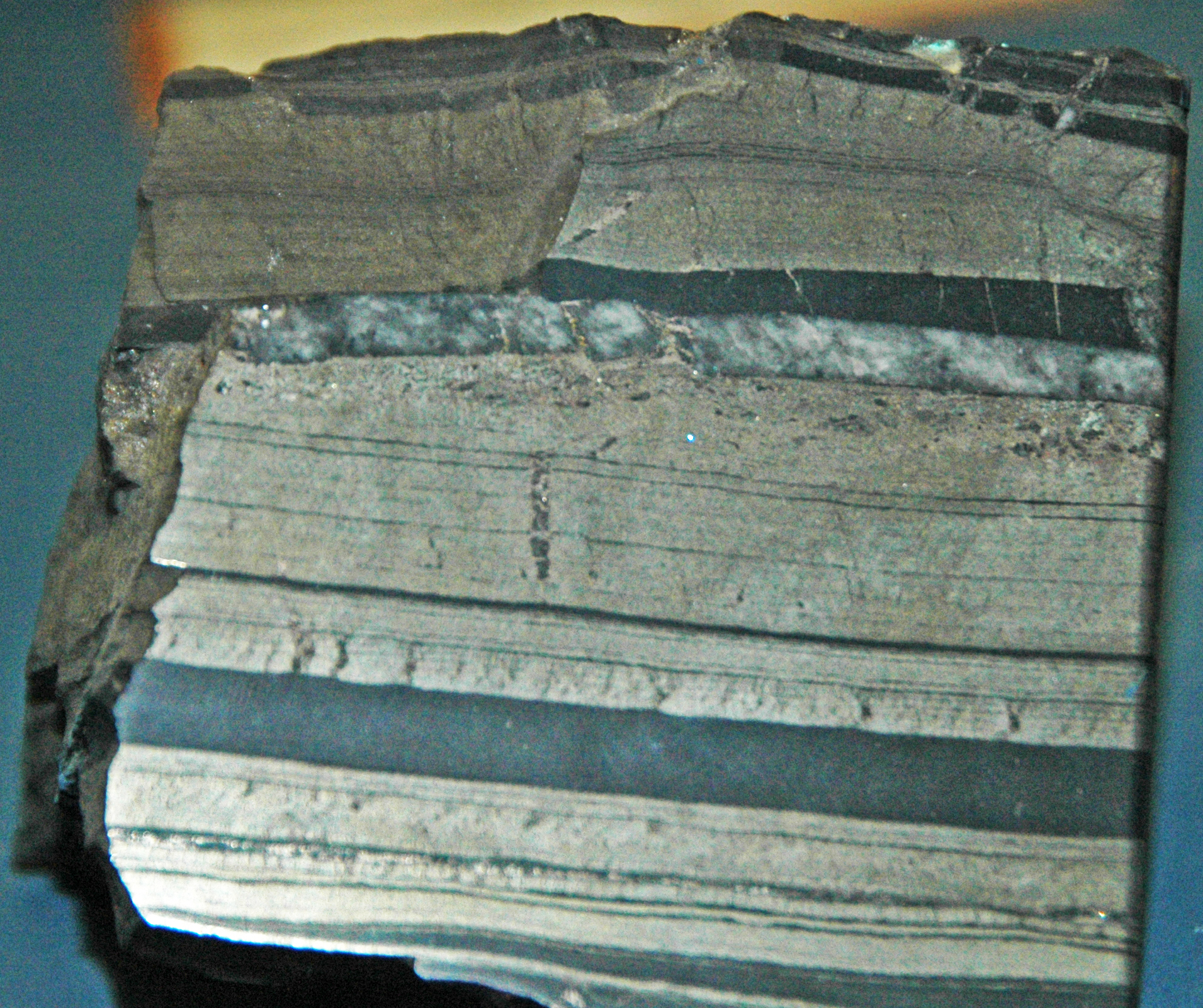
- Banded fine-grained pyrite found in the Urquhart Shale, Australia

Chronology
An approximate timescale of key Mesoproterozoic events Vertical axis scale: Millions of years ago
- Proposed redefinition(s): 1780–850 Ma; Gradstein et al., 2012
- Proposed subdivisions: Rodinian Period, 1780–850 Ma; Gradstein et al., 2012

Etymology
- Name formality: Formal

Usage information
- Celestial body: Earth
- Regional usage: Global (ICS)
- Time scale(s) used: ICS Time Scale

Definition
- Chronological unit: Era
- Stratigraphic unit: Erathem
- Time span formality: Formal
- Lower boundary definition: Defined Chronometrically
- Lower GSSA ratified: 1990
- Upper boundary definition: Defined Chronometrically
- Upper GSSA ratified: 1990

The Mesoproterozoic Era (Note: There are several ways of pronouncing Mesoproterozoic, including IPA: /ˌmɛzəˌproʊtərəˈzoʊɪk, ˌmɛzoʊ-, ˌmɛs-, ˌmiːz-, ˌmiː.s-, -ˌprɒt-, -əroʊ-, -trə-, -troʊ-/ MEZ-ə-PROH-tər-ə-ZOH-ik, MEZ-oh-, MESS-, MEE-z-, MEE-s-, -PROT-, -ər-oh-, -trə-, -troh-.) is a geologic era that occurred from 1,600 to 1,000 million years ago. The Mesoproterozoic was the first era of Earth's history for which a fairly definitive geological record survives. Continents existed during the preceding era (the Paleoproterozoic), but little is known about them. The continental masses of the Mesoproterozoic were more or less the same ones that exist today, although their arrangement on the Earth's surface was different.

== Major events and characteristics ==
The major events of this era are the breakup of the Columbia supercontinent, the formation of the Rodinia supercontinent, and the evolution of sexual reproduction.

This era is marked by the further development of continental plates and plate tectonics. The supercontinent of Columbia broke up between 1500 and 1350 million years ago, and the fragments reassembled into the supercontinent of Rodinia around 1100 to 900 million years ago, on the time boundary between the Mesoproterozoic and the subsequent Neoproterozoic. These tectonic events were accompanied by numerous orogenies (episodes of mountain building) that included the Kibaran orogeny in Africa; the Late Ruker orogeny in Antarctica; the Gothian and Sveconorwegian orogenies in Europe; and the Picuris and Grenville orogenies in North America.

The era saw the development of sexual reproduction, which greatly increased the complexity of life to come and signified the start of development of true multicellular organisms. Though the biota of the era was once thought to be exclusively microbial, recent finds have shown multicellular life did exist during the Mesoproterozoic. This era was also the high point of the stromatolites before they declined in the Neoproterozoic.

== Subdivisions ==
The subdivisions of the Mesoproterozoic are arbitrary divisions based on time. They are not geostratigraphic or biostratigraphic units. The decision to base the Precambrian time scale on radiometric dating reflects the sparse nature of the fossil record, and Precambrian subdivisions of geologic time roughly reflect major tectonic cycles. It is possible that future revisions to the time scale will reflect more "natural" boundaries based on correlative geologic events.

The Mesoproterozoic is presently divided into the Calymmian (1600 to 1400 Mya) and the Ectasian (1400 to 1200 Mya), and the Stenian (1200 to 1000 Mya). The Calymmian and Ectasian were characterized by stabilization and expansion of cratonic covers and the Stenian by formation of orogenic belts.

The time period from 1780 Ma to 850 Ma, an unofficial period based on stratigraphy rather than chronometry, named the Rodinian, is described in the geological timescale review 2012 edited by Gradstein et al., but as of February 2017, this has not yet been officially adopted by the International Union of Geological Sciences (IUGS).

== See also ==
- Boring Billion
