= List of orogenies =

Known mountain building events of the Earth's history

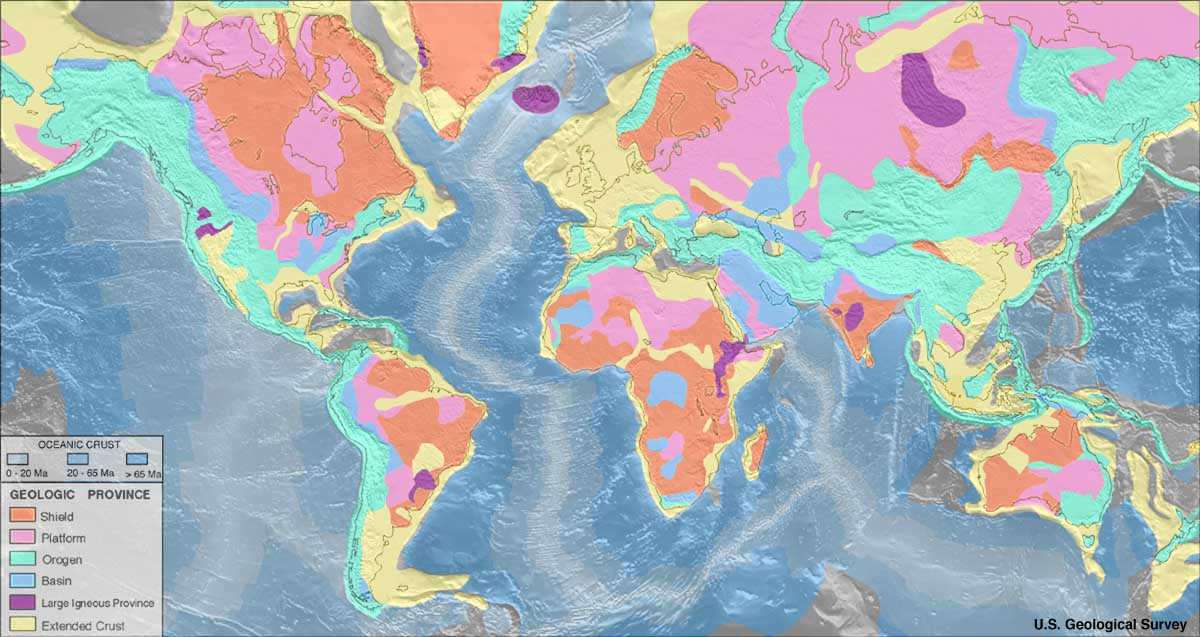
Geologic provinces of the world (USGS): Shield Platform Orogen Basin Large igneous province Extended crust / Oceanic crust: 0–20 Ma 20–65 Ma >65 Ma

The following is a list of known orogenies organised by continent, starting with the oldest in each. The headings are present-day continents, which may differ from the geography contemporary to the orogenies. Some orogenies encompass more than one continent and may have different names in each, and some very large orogenies include sub-orogenies. As with other geological phenomena, orogenies are often subject to revised interpretations of their age, type and associated paleogeography.

In some (especially older) literature, the term orogeny refers to a long episode of basin formation and deposition of sediments over hundreds of millions of years, ending with deformation (sometimes including metamorphism) of these deposits. However, some workers use the term only for the final mountain-building deformation event over tens of millions of years or shorter.

== African orogenies ==
- Pan-African orogeny – Series of major mountain-forming events in the Neoproterozoic, Neoproterozoic Era (550 Ma)
- Damara orogeny – Mountain-building event at the intersection of the Congo and Kalahari cratons
- Kibaran orogeny – Mountain building event in what is now Africa
- Eburnean orogeny – Mountain building event in what is now West Africa
- East African Orogeny – Main stage in the Neoproterozoic assembly of East and West Gondwana
- Mauritanide Orogeny – Ancient orogen parallel to the west coast of Africa from Morocco to Guinea-Bissau
- Mozambique Orogeny – Band in the Earth's crust from East Antarctica to the Arabian-Nubian Shield
- Zambezian Orogeny – Area of mountain building now in southern Zambia and northern Zimbabwe

== Antarctic orogenies ==
Orogenies affecting Antarctica include:

- Napier orogeny – Mountain range in East Antarctica – (4000±200 Ma)
- Rayner orogeny – (c. 3500 Ma)
- Humboldt orogeny – Geologic formation in Antarctica, (c. 3000 Ma)
- Insel orogeny – (2650±150 Ma)
- Early Ruker orogeny – (2000–1700 Ma)
- Late Ruker orogeny, also known as the Nimrod orogeny – (1000±150 Ma)
- Beardmore orogeny – (633–620 Ma)
- Ross orogeny – Paleozoic mountain building event in Antarctica – (c. 550 – c. 480 Ma)
- Borchgrevink orogeny
- Peninsula orogeny

== Asian orogenies ==
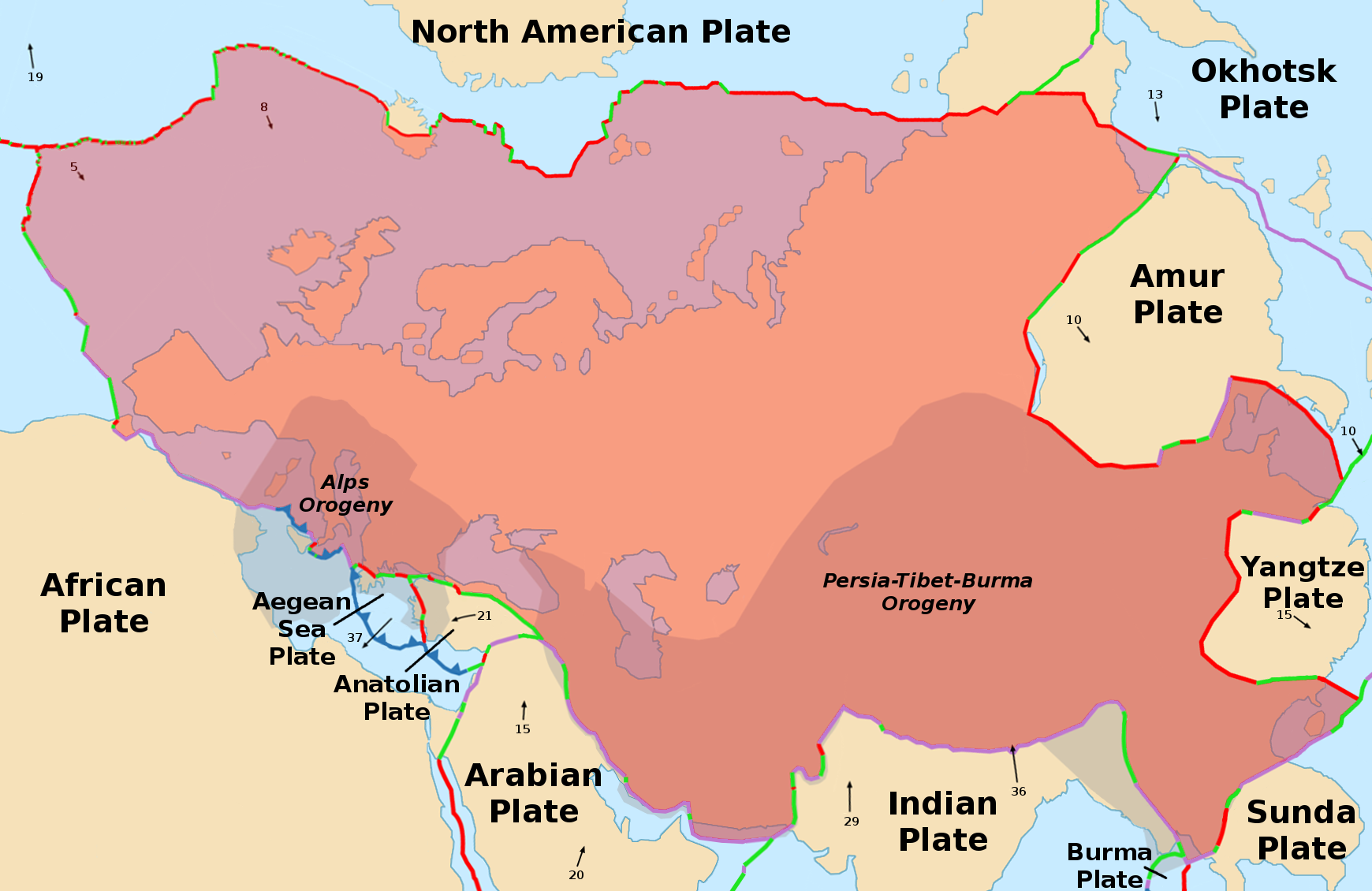
Persia–Tibet–Burma orogeny in Eurasian Plate

- Aravalli-Delhi Orogen – Precambrian
- Altaid Orogeny – Paleozoic Era
- Uralian orogeny – Geological events that formed the Ural Mountains during the Permian Period
- Cimmerian and Cathaysian orogenies
  - Active through Triassic and Jurassic Periods along south and southeast Asia.
- Dabie-Sulu orogeny – Mesozoic Era
- Persia–Tibet–Burma orogeny – Cenozoic Era; caused by the continuing collision of the Arabian and Indian Plates with the Eurasian Plate, encompassing:
  - Himalayan orogeny – Forming the Himalaya Mountains

== European orogenies ==
- Saamian orogeny – Formation of an extensive area of tonalitic-trondhjemitic crust in Fennoscandia, (3.1–2.9 Ga)
- Lopian orogeny – Archean orogeny – Formation of two different types of terrain compatible with plate tectonic concepts. One is a belt of high-grade gneisses formed in a regime of strong mobility, while the other is a region of granitoid intrusions and greenstone belts surrounded by the remnants of a Saamian substratum, (2.9–2.6 Ga)
- Svecofennian orogeny, also known as Svecokarelian orogeny – Geological processes in Sweden, Finland, and Russia, (2.0–1.75 Ga)
- Gothian orogeny – Orogeny in western Fennoscandia – Formation of tonalitic-granodioritic plutonic rocks and calc-alkaline volcanites (like the previous Svecofennian orogeny), (1.75–1.5 Ga)
- Sveconorwegian orogeny – Orogenic belt in southwestern Sweden and southern Norway – Essentially reworking of previously formed crust, (1.25 Ga – 900 Ma)
- Timanide orogeny – Orogen that formed during the Neoproterozoic – Affecting the northern Baltic Shield during the Neoproterozoic Era, (620–550 Ma)
- Cadomian orogeny – Tectonic event(s) in the late Neoproterozoic – On the north coast of Armorica in the Ediacaran/Cambrian, (660–540 Ma)
- Caledonian orogeny – Mountain building event caused by the collision of Laurentia, Baltica and Avalonia – Deformation of the western Scandinavian Peninsula, Britain and Ireland, in the Ordovician Grampian phase and the Silurian Scandian phase
- Variscan orogeny, also known as Hercynian orogeny – Collision of tectonic plates resulting in the creation of mountains – Deformation in western Iberia, southwest Ireland, southwest England, central and western France, southern Germany and Czech Republic, during the Devonian and Carboniferous Periods
- Uralian orogeny – Geological events that formed the Ural Mountains, during the Permian Period.
- Alpine orogeny – Formation of the Alpine mountain ranges of Europe, the Middle East and northwest Africa, encompassing:
  - The Formation of the Alps, during the Eocene through Miocene Periods
  - Carpathian orogeny – Building the Carpathian Mountains of eastern Europe, during the Jurassic-Cretaceous to Miocene Period
  - Hellenic orogeny – Collective Noun – In Greece and the Aegean area, during Eocene through Miocene Periods

== North American orogenies ==
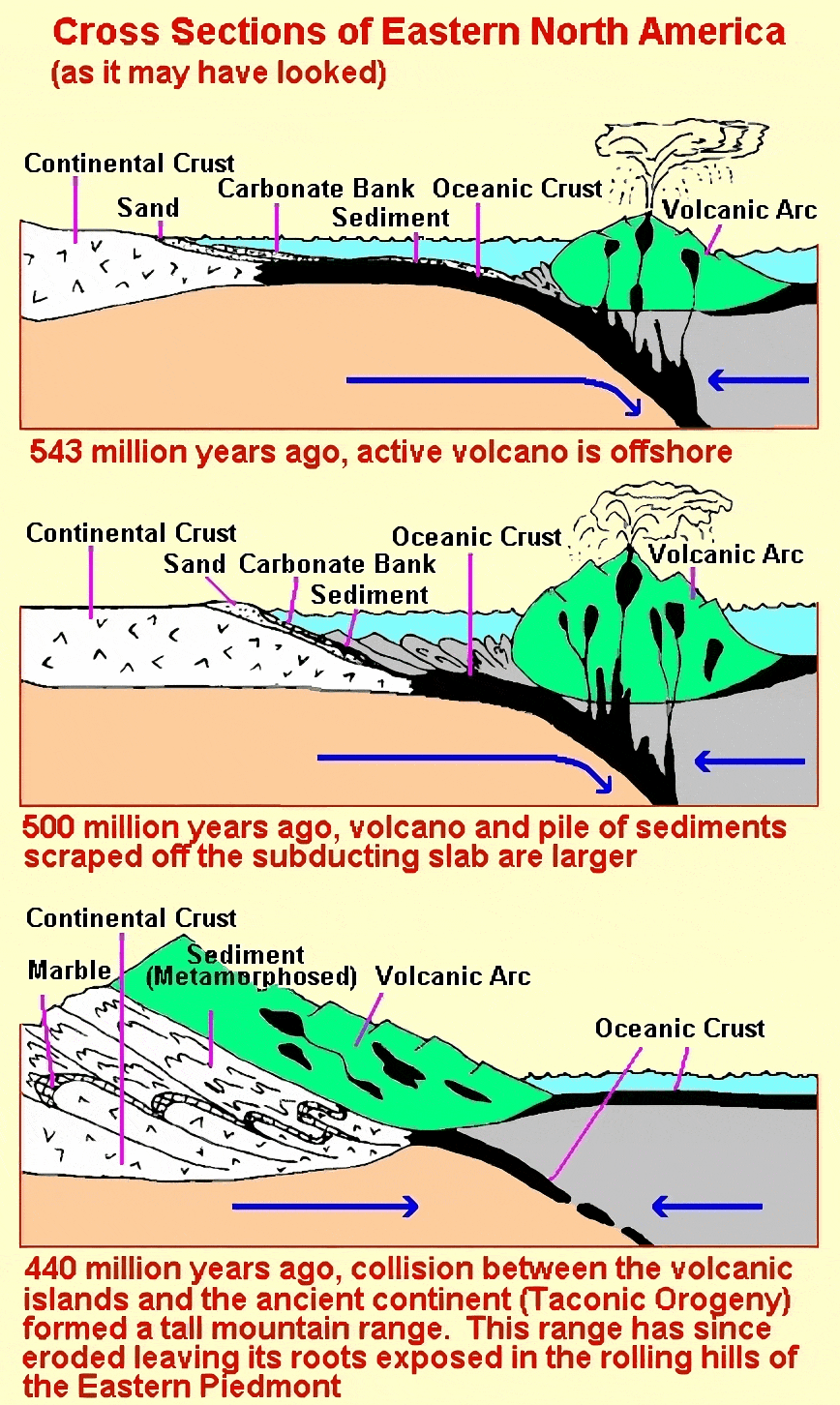
Taconic orogeny

- Algoman orogeny, also known as Kenoran orogeny – Late Archaean episode of mountain building in what is now North America – Superior province, South Dakota to Lake Huron, late Archean Eon (2700–2500 Ma)
- Wopmay orogeny – Mountain-building event in northern Canada – Along western edge of Canadian Shield, (2100–1900 Ma)
- Trans-Hudson orogeny, also known as Hudsonian orogeny – Mountain-building event in North America – Extends from Hudson Bay west into Saskatchewan then south through the western Dakotas and Nebraska. Result of the collision of the Superior craton with the Hearne craton and the Wyoming craton, during the Proterozoic Eon (2000–1800 Ma)
- Nagssugtoqidian orogeny – Late Paleoproterozoic mountain-building event in Greenland – (1910–1770 Ma)
- Ketilidian orogeny – Collision at the southern margin of the North Atlantic Craton, late Paleoproterozoic Era (1850–1720 Ma)
- Penokean orogeny – Wisconsin, Minnesota, Michigan, and southern Ontario, (1850–1840 Ma)
- Great Falls orogeny, also known as the Big Sky orogeny – Proterozoic collision between the Hearne craton and the Wyoming craton in southwest Montana, (1770 Ma)
- Ivanpah orogeny – Mountain building event in the Proterozoic – Mojave Desert region, southwestern U.S.
- Yavapai orogeny – Mountain building event 1.7 billion years ago in the southwestern United States, (1710–1700 Ma)
- Mazatzal orogeny – Mountain-building event in North America – Mid to southwestern U.S., (1675–1650 Ma)
- Picuris orogeny – Mountain-building event in what is now the Southwestern US – Mid to southwestern U.S., (1430–1300 Ma)
- Grenville orogeny – Mesoproterozoic mountain-building event – Worldwide, during the late Proterozoic Eon (1300–1000 Ma). Associated with the assembly of the supercontinent Rodinia. Formed folded mountains in eastern North America from Newfoundland to North Carolina, (1100–1000 Ma)
- Caledonian orogeny – Mountain building event caused by the collision of Laurentia, Baltica and Avalonia, including:
  - East Greenland Orogen – From Cryogenian to Devonian Periods
  - Taconic phase – Mountain-building period that affected most of New England – In the northeastern U.S. and Canada, during the Ordovician Period
  - Acadian phase – North American orogeny – In the eastern U.S., during the Silurian and Devonian Periods
- Appalachian orogeny – Mountain-forming event that formed the Appalachian and Allegheny Mountains – Usually seen as the same as the Variscan orogeny in Europe
  - Appalachian Mountains are a well-studied orogenic belt resulting from a late Paleozoic collision between North America and Africa.
  - Taconic orogeny – Mountain-building period that affected most of New England
  - Acadian orogeny – North American orogeny
  - Alleghanian orogeny – Mountain-forming event that formed the Appalachian and Allegheny Mountains
- Ouachita orogeny – Mountain-building event that resulted in the Ouachita Mountains Ouachita Mountains of Arkansas and Oklahoma is an orogenic belt that dates from the late Paleozoic Era and is most likely a continuation of the Appalachian orogeny west across the Mississippi embayment – Reelfoot Rift zone.
- Antler orogeny – Tectonic event from the Late Devonian into the Mississippian and early Pennsylvanian – Ancestral Sierra Nevada, western U.S., from late Devonian Period to early Mississippian age
- Innuitian orogeny, also known as Ellesmerian orogeny – Major tectonic episode in the Canadian Arctic and Northernmost Greenland – Innuitian Mountains, Canadian Arctic, extending from Ellesmere Island to Melville Island, Mississippian age (345 Ma)
- Sonoma orogeny – Rocky Mountains, western North America, (270–240 Ma)
- Nevadan orogeny – Mountain building event in North America – Developed along western North America, during the Jurassic Period
- Sevier orogeny – Mountain-building episode in North America – Rocky Mountains, western North America, (140–50 Ma)
- Laramide orogeny – Period of mountain building in North America – Rocky Mountains, western North America, (70-40 Ma)
- Pasadena orogeny – Transverse Ranges, western North America, Pleistocene Period to present day

== Oceania orogenies ==
=== Australian orogenies ===
- Sleaford orogeny – Gawler craton, South Australia, (2440–2420 Ma)
- Glenburgh orogeny – Glenburgh Terrane, Western Australia, (c. 2005–1920 Ma)
- Barramundi orogeny – MacArthur Basin, northern Australia, (c. 1890–1850 Ma)
- Kimban orogeny – Gawler craton, South Australia, (c. 1845–1700 Ma)
- Cornian orogeny – Gawler craton, South Australia
- Miltalie orogeny – Gawler craton, South Australia
- Yapungku orogeny – North Yilgarn craton margin, Western Australia, (c. 1765 Ma)
- Albany-Fraser orogeny – Mountain-forming period in Australia – Western Australia, (c. 1710–1020 Ma)
- Mangaroon orogeny – Gascoyne Complex, Western Australia, (c. 1680–1620 Ma)
- Isan orogeny – Mount Isa Block, Queensland, (c. 1600 Ma)
- Kararan orogeny – Event in South Australia – Gawler craton, South Australia, (1570–1555 Ma)
- Olarian orogeny – Olary Block, South Australia
- Capricorn orogeny – Gascoyne Complex, Western Australia
- Musgrave orogeny – Musgrave Block, Central Australia, (c. 1080 Ma)
- Edmundian orogeny – Gascoyne Complex, Western Australia, (c. 920–850 Ma)
- Petermann Orogeny – Neoproterozoic mountain building event – Central Australia, late Neoproterozoic Era to Cambrian Period (c. 630–520 Ma)
- Delamerian Orogeny – Major geological province in Australia – South Australia and Victoria, Ordovician Period, (c. 514–510 Ma)
- Lachlan Orogeny – Geological feature in Australia – Victoria and New South Wales, (c. 540 and 440 Ma)
- Thomson Orogeny – Mountain building process in Gondwana – Northern continuation of the Lachlan Orogeny
- Alice Springs Orogeny – Australian mountain building event – Central Australia, early Carboniferous Period, (450–300 Ma)
- Kanimblan Orogeny – Ancient Australian mountain-building event – Victoria and New South Wales, Carboniferous Period (c. 318 Ma)
- Hunter-Bowen orogeny, also known as New England Orogeny – Queensland and New South Wales, Permian Period to Triassic Period (c. 260–225 Ma)
- Sprigg Orogeny – continuing uplift of the Flinders and Mt Lofty Ranges in South Australia (Miocene – present)

=== New Zealand orogenies ===
- Tuhua Orogeny – Mountain-building process in New Zealand, (370–330 Ma)
- Rangitata Orogeny, (142–99 Ma)
- Kaikoura Orogeny – Seismic formation event, (24 Ma – present)

== South American orogenies ==
- Transamazonian orogeny – Paleoproterozoic
- Guriense orogeny
- Sunsás orogeny – Ancient orogeny
- Cariri Velhos orogeny – Belt of rocks in Brazil
- Brasiliano-Pan African orogeny – Brasilia Belt
  - Pampean orogeny – Paraguai Belt
- Chonide orogeny – Mountain building event in the Triassic
- Terra Australis Orogeny – Geological feature
  - Pampean orogeny
  - Famatinian orogeny – Paleozoic geological event in South America
- San Rafael orogeny
- Gondwanide orogeny – Permian mountain forming tectonic event – Sierra de la Ventana
- Toco orogeny, Chilean Coast Range, (300–330 Ma)
- Andean orogeny – Ongoing mountain-forming process in South America, Andes Mountains, (200 Ma – present)

== Table ==
| Orogeny | Estimated start time(Ga) | Estimated end time(Ga) | Continent |
|---|---|---|---|
| Pan-African orogeny | .55 | .55 | Africa |
| Damara orogeny | .53 | .5 | Africa |
| Kibaran orogeny | 1.4 | 1 | Africa |
| Eburnean orogeny | 2.2 | 2 | Africa |
| East African Orogeny | .75 | .55 | Africa |
| Mauritanide Orogeny | .32 | .27 | Africa |
| Mozambique Orogeny | 2.65 | 2.97 | Africa |
| Zambezi Orogeny | .89 | .53 | Africa |
| Napier orogeny | 4 | | Antarctica |
| Rayner orogeny | 3.5 | | Antarctica |
| Humboldt orogeny | 3 | | Antarctica |
| Insel orogeny | 2.65 | | Antarctica |
| Early Ruker orogeny | 2 | 1.7 | Antarctica |
| Late Ruker orogeny | 1 | | Antarctica |
| Beardmore orogeny | .62 | | Antarctica |
| Ross orogeny | .55 | .48 | Antarctica |
| Borchgrevink orogeny | .42 | .35 | Antarctica |
| Aravalli-Delhi Orogen | 2.3 | | Asia |
| Altaid Orogeny | .54 | | Asia |
| Cimmerian orogeny | .22 | | Asia |
| Dabie-Sulu orogeny | .24 | | Asia |
| Persia–Tibet–Burma orogeny | .55 | | Asia |
| Himalayan orogeny | .29 | .16 | Asia |
| Saamian orogeny | 3.1 | 2.9 | Europe |
| Lopian orogeny | 2.9 | 2.6 | Europe |
| Svecofennian orogeny | 2.0 | 1.75 | Europe |
| Gothian orogeny | 1.75 | 1.5 | Europe |
| Sveconorwegian orogeny | 1.14 | .96 | Europe |
| Timanide orogeny | .62 | .55 | Europe |
| Cadomian orogeny | .66 | .54 | Europe |
| Caledonian orogeny | .49 | .39 | Europe |
| Variscan orogeny | .44 | .35 | Europe |
| Uralian orogeny | .32 | .25 | Europe |
| Alpine orogeny | .15 | .25 | Europe |
| Mediterranean Ridge | .15 | | Europe |
| Algoman orogeny | 2.7 | 2.5 | North America |
| Wopmay orogeny | 2.1 | 1.9 | North America |
| Trans-Hudson orogeny | 1 | 1.8 | North America |
| Nagssugtoqidian orogeny | 1.9 | 1.8 | North America |
| Ketilidian orogeny | 1.85 | 1.72 | North America |
| Penokean orogeny | 1.85 | 1.84 | North America |
| Great Falls orogeny | 1.77 | | North America |
| Ivanpah orogeny | 1.71 | 1.70 | North America |
| Yavapai orogeny | 1.71 | 1.70 | North America |
| Mazatzal orogeny | 1.67 | 1.65 | North America |
| Picuris orogeny | 1.43 | 1.30 | North America |
| Grenville orogeny | 1.25 | .98 | North America |
| Caledonian orogeny East Greenland Orogen | .72 | .42 | North America |
| Appalachian orogeny | .48 | | North America |
| Taconic orogeny | .44 | | North America |
| Acadian orogeny | .37 | | North America |
| Alleghanian orogeny | .35 | | North America |
| Ouachita orogeny | .29 | | North America |
| Antler orogeny | .35 | .32 | North America |
| Innuitian orogeny | .45 | | North America |
| Sonoma orogeny | .27 | .24 | North America |
| Nevadan orogeny | .2 | | North America |
| Sevier orogeny | .14 | .05 | North America |
| Laramide orogeny | .07 | .04 | North America |
| Pasadena orogeny | .03 | | North America |
| Sleaford orogeny | 2.44 | 2.42 | Oceania |
| Glenburgh orogeny | 2 | 1.92 | Oceania |
| Barramundi orogeny | 1.89 | 1.85 | Oceania |
| Kimban orogeny | 1.84 | 1.70 | Oceania |
| Cornian orogeny | 2 | 1.86 | Oceania |
| Miltalie orogeny | 1.95 | | Oceania |
| Yapungku orogeny | 1.76 | | Oceania |
| Albany-Fraser orogeny | 1.71 | 1.02 | Oceania |
| Mangaroon orogeny | 1.68 | 1.62 | Oceania |
| Isan orogeny | 1.60 | | Oceania |
| Kararan orogeny | 1.57 | 1.55 | Oceania |
| Olarian orogeny | 1.45 | | Oceania |
| Capricorn orogeny | 1.3 | | Oceania |
| Musgrave orogeny | 1.22 | 1.12 | Oceania |
| Edmundian orogeny | 1.68 | 1.46 | Oceania |
| Petermann orogeny | .55 | .53 | Oceania |
| Delamerian Orogeny | .51 | | Oceania |
| Lachlan Orogeny | .54 | .44 | Oceania |
| Thomson Orogeny | .51 | .49 | Oceania |
| Alice Springs Orogeny | .45 | .30 | Oceania |
| Kanimblan Orogeny | .32 | | Oceania |
| Hunter-Bowen orogeny | .26 | .22 | Oceania |
| Tuhua Orogeny | .37 | .33 | Oceania |
| Rangitata Orogeny | .14 | .09 | Oceania |
| Kaikoura Orogeny | .03 | | Oceania |
| Transamazonian orogeny | 2.14 | 1.94 | South America |
| Guriense orogeny | 2.8 | 2.7 | South America |
| Sunsás orogeny | 1.4 | 1.1 | South America |
| Cariri Velhos orogeny | .54 | | South America |
| Brasiliano-Pan African orogeny | .54 | | South America |
| Pampean orogeny | .53 | .48 | South America |
| Chonide orogeny | .25 | .20 | South America |
| Terra Australis Orogen | .54 | .23 | South America |
| Famatinian orogeny | .49 | .46 | South America |
| San Rafael orogeny | .29 | .25 | South America |
| Toco orogeny | .33 | .30 | South America |
| Andean orogeny | .20 | 0 | South America |
