= Chonide orogeny =

Mountain building event in the Triassic

The Chonide orogeny was a mountain building event in the Triassic, preserved in coastal accretionary complexes in southwestern Chile. The Chonos Metamorphic Complex, Madre de Dios Accretionary Complex and Diego de Almagro Complex all crop out west of the South Patagonian Batholith. Rocks in the Chonos Metamorphic Complex include turbidites as well as meta-chert and mafic schist. Some researchers propose that during the Permian, the supercontinent Gondwana moved rapidly northward leading to the formation of back-arc marginal basins. The closure of the basins then resulted in the orogeny.

== See also ==
- Geology of Chile
- Geology of Argentina
- List of orogenies
