= Guriense orogeny =

Prehistoric event

The Guriense orogeny was a mountain building event in the Archean 2.8 to 2.7 billion years ago, preserved in the Guyana Shield rocks of Venezuela, Guyana and Suriname.

== See also ==
- Geology of Venezuela
- Geology of Guyana
- Geology of Suriname
- List of orogenies
