= Columbia (supercontinent) =

Ancient supercontinent of approximately 2,500 to 1,500 million years ago

The supercontinent Columbia about 1.6 billion years ago, The image depicts the current accepted configuration for Columbia supercontinent which varies from the initial configuration proposed by Rogers and Santosh (2002)

Columbia, also known as Nuna or Hudsonland, is a hypothetical ancient supercontinent first proposed in 2002 by geologists John J. W. Rogers and M. Santosh, thought to have existed approximately 2,500 to 1,500 million years ago (Ma) in the Paleoproterozoic era. The assembly of the supercontinent was likely completed during global-scale collisional events from 2,100 to 1,800 Ma during the Orosirian period.

Columbia consisted of proto-cratons that made up the cores of the continents of Laurentia, Baltica, Ukrainian Shield, Amazonian Craton, Australia, and possibly Siberia, North China, and Kalaharia as well. The evidence of Columbia's existence is provided by geological and paleomagnetic data.

== Size and location ==
Life timeline
← / Earth formed; ← / Earliest water; ← / LUCA; ← / Earliest fossils; ← / Great Oxygenation Event; ← / Sexual reproduction; ← / Earliest fungi; ← / Neoproterozoic oxygenation event; ← / Ediacaran biota; ← / Cambrian explosion; ← / Earliest tetrapods; ← / Earliest hominoid
(million years ago)

Columbia is estimated to have been approximately 12,900 km (8,000 mi) from north to south at its broadest part. The eastern coast of India was attached to western North America, with southern Australia against western Canada. In the Paleoproterozoic most of South America was rotated such that the western edge of modern-day Brazil lined up with eastern North America, forming a continental margin that extended into the southern edge of Scandinavia.

== Formation ==
Columbia was assembled along global-scale 2.1–1.8 Ga collisional orogens and contained almost all of Earth's continental blocks. Some of the events associated with the assembly of Columbia are:

- the cratonic blocks in South America and West Africa were welded by the 2.1–2.0 Ga Transamazonian and Eburnean orogens;
- the Kaapvaal and Zimbabwe cratons in southern Africa were collided along the c. 2.0 Ga Limpopo Belt;
- the cratonic blocks of Laurentia were sutured along the 1.9–1.8 Ga Trans-Hudson, Penokean, Taltson–Thelon, Wopmay, Ungava, Torngat, and Nagssugtoqidian orogens;
- the Kola, Karelia, Volgo–Uralia, and Sarmatia cratons in Baltica (Eastern Europe) were joined by the 1.9–1.8 Ga Kola–Karelia, Svecofennian, Volyn-Central Russian, and Pachelma orogens;
- the Anabar and Aldan Cratons in Siberia were connected by the 1.9–1.8 Ga Akitkan and Central Aldan orogens;
- the East Antarctica and an unknown continental block were joined by the 1.73–1.70 Ga Early Ruker orogeny;
- the South and North Indian Blocks were amalgamated along the Central Indian Tectonic Zone;
- and the eastern and western blocks of the North China Craton were welded together by the c. 1.85 Ga Trans-North China Orogen.

There is evidence from zircons that an extensive high mountain range (dubbed the Nuna Supermountains) formed at 2.0–1.8 Ga.

== Outgrowth ==
Following its final assembly at c. 1.82 Ga, Columbia underwent long-lived (1.82–1.5 Ga), subduction-related growth via accretion at key continental margins, forming at 1.82–1.5 Ga a great magmatic accretionary belt along the present-day southern margin of North America, Greenland, and Baltica. It includes the 1.8–1.7 Ga Yavapai, Central Plains and Makkovikian Belts, 1.7–1.6 Ga Mazatzal and Labradorian Belts, 1.5–1.3 Ga St. Francois and Spavinaw Belts, and 1.3–1.2 Ga Elzevirian Belt in North America; the 1.8–1.7 Ga Ketilidian Belt in Greenland; and the 1.8–1.7 Transscandinavian Igneous Belt, 1.7–1.6 Ga Kongsberggian-Gothian Belt, and 1.5–1.3 Ga Southwest Sweden Granitoid Belt in Baltica. Other cratonic blocks also underwent marginal outgrowth at about the same time.

In South America, a 1.8–1.3 Ga accretionary zone occurs along the western margin of the Amazonia Craton, represented by the Rio Negro, Juruena, and Rondonian Belts. In Australia, 1.8–1.5 Ga accretionary magmatic belts, including the Arunta, Mount Isa, Georgetown, Coen, and Broken Hill Belts, occur surrounding the southern and eastern margins of the North Australia Craton and the eastern margin of the Gawler craton. In China, a 1.8–1.4 Ga accretionary magmatic zone, called the Xiong'er belt (Group), extends along the southern margin of the North China Craton.

== Fragmentation ==
Columbia began to fragment about 1.5–1.35 Ga, associated with continental rifting along the western margin of Laurentia (Belt-Purcell Supergroup), eastern India (Mahanadi and the Godavari), southern margin of Baltica (Telemark Supergroup), southeastern margin of Siberia (Riphean aulacogens), northwestern margin of South Africa (Kalahari Copper Belt), and northern margin of the North China Block (Zhaertai-Bayan Obo Belt).

The fragmentation corresponded with widespread anorogenic magmatic activity, forming anorthosite-mangerite-charnockite-granite suites in North America, Baltica, Amazonia, and North China, and continued until the final breakup of the supercontinent at about 1.3–1.2 Ga, marked by the emplacement of the 1.27 Ga Mackenzie and 1.24 Ga Sudbury mafic dyke swarms in North America. Other dyke swarms associated with extensional tectonics and the break-up of Columbia include the Satakunta-Ulvö dyke swarm in Fennoscandia and the Galiwinku dyke swarm in Australia.

An area around Georgetown in northern Queensland, Australia, has been suggested to consist of rocks that originally formed part of Nuna 1.7 Ga in what is now northern Canada.

== Configuration ==
In the initial configuration of Rogers and Santosh, South Africa, Madagascar, India, Australia, and attached parts of Antarctica are placed adjacent to the western margin of North America, whereas Greenland, Baltica (Northern Europe), and Siberia are positioned adjacent to the northern margin of North America, and South America is placed against West Africa. In the same year (2002), Zhao et al. proposed an alternative configuration of Columbia, in which the fits of Baltica and Siberia with Laurentia and the fit of South America with West Africa are similar to those of the Rogers and Santosh configuration, whereas the fits of India, East Antarctica, South Africa, and Australia with Laurentia are similar to their corresponding fits in the configuration of Rodinia.

This continental configuration is based on the available geological reconstructions of 2.1–1.8 Ga orogens and related Archean cratonic blocks, especially on those reconstructions between South America and west Africa; western Australia and southern Africa; Laurentia and Baltica; Siberia and Laurentia; Laurentia and central Australia; East Antarctica and Laurentia; and North China and India. Of these reconstructions, the fits of Baltica and Siberia with Laurentia; South America with west Africa; and southern Africa with western Australia are also consistent with paleomagnetic data.

A new configuration of Columbia was reconstructed by Guiting Hou based on the reconstruction of giant radiating dike swarms. Another configuration has been suggested by Chaves and Rezende supported on available paleomagnetic data and fragments of 1.79-1.75 Ga large igneous provinces.

== Name and synonyms ==
Rogers and Santosh proposed the name Columbia for a hypothetical supercontinent preceding Rodinia. They chose the name because critical evidence for the supercontinent was provided by the relationship between the Columbia region of North America (centered on the state of Washington) and east India.

The naming is not universally accepted. In 1997, P.F. Hoffman proposed the name Nuna (from Inuit "lands bordering the northern oceans") for the Proterozoic core of Laurentia plus Baltica. Because Hoffman published his name earlier than Rogers and Santosh published theirs, there have been calls to use Nuna rather than Columbia, on the basis of scientific precedence. However, Nuna was essentially equivalent to an earlier Nena, and neither clearly referred to an early supercontinent as Columbia did, rather than merely the core of this earlier supercontinent. Other earlier speculative continents included Hudsonland and Arctica, but Rogers and Santosh were the first to give a complete reconstruction of a Paleoproterozic supercontinent preceding Rodinia.

== See also ==
- Plate tectonics
- Supercontinent cycle
