= Nena (supercontinent) =

Early Proterozoic supercontinent

Orientation of different continents in Columbia

Nena, an acronym for Northern Europe–North America, was the Early Proterozoic amalgamation of Baltica and Laurentia into a single "cratonic landmass", a name first proposed in 1990. Since then several similar Proterozoic supercontinents have been proposed, including Nuna and Arctica, that include other Archaean cratons, such as Siberia and East Antarctica. In the original concept Nena formed c. 1,900 million years ago in the Penokean, Makkovikan, Ketilidian, and Svecofennian orogenies. However, because Nena excludes several known Archaean cratons, including those in India and Australia, it is strictly speaking not a supercontinent. Although Nena and Nuna share many similarities, Nena accounted for a larger landmass than Nuna. This extended landmass included the Angara, Antarctica, Baltica, Laurentia, and Siberia bodies. Nena, or Nuna, can, nevertheless be thought of as the core of Columbia, another supercontinent concept with several proposed configurations.

The first concept of the Nena supercontinent originated with the southern regions of proto-Laurentia and the western regions proto-Baltica merging throughout the Proterozoic eon. This concept would eventually be developed to the modern day conceptualization of the Nena supercontinent which includes additions of the Angara, Antarctica, and Siberia landmasses.

Throughout the amalgamation of the microcontinents which would form proto-Nena, several significant geologic processes occurred including orogenesis and continental magmatic accretion. The by-products of these processes can be found numerous regions such as southwest Ontario, northwest British Isles, and Greenland. These by-products include the Marquette Range supergroup and the Moran Lake and lower Aillik groups northwest of the Makkovik orogen. These geologic findings provided a basis for the concept of the Nena supercontinent.

Nena as a continent has been associated with the Sudbury Basin Impact.
