= Cornian orogeny =

The Cornian orogeny was a small scale orogenic event between 2.0 and 1.86 billion years ago in the Proterozoic. At the time, the Gawler craton in what is now Australia may have been experiencing passive margin conditions, given the rocks found in the Hutchison Group overlying the Miltalie Gneiss (formed in the earlier Miltalie event). The orogeny caused metamorphism and east-southeast striking rock fabrics. The event is mostly preserved east of the Kalinjala Shear Zone along with the Donington Suite intrusive rocks.

== See also ==
- List of orogenies
