= Albany-Fraser orogeny =

Mountain-forming period in Australia

The Albany-Fraser orogeny was an orogenic event which created the Albany-Fraser Orogen in what is now Australia between 2.63 and 1.16 billion years ago, during the late Archean and Proterozoic. Tectonic history developed from isotope dating suggests that the orogeny occurred as the combined North Australia Craton-West Australia Craton collided with the East Antarctic-South Australian Craton. The Kepa Kurl Booya Province, including its component zones, the Fraser Zone, Nornalup Zone and Biranup Zone represents the crystalline basement of the orogen. Numerous theories and hypotheses have been presented about the orogeny. For example, in 2011 geochronology dating of 1.71 to 1.65 billion year old granite and gabbro intrusions in the Biranup Zone suggested craton margin rocks rather than a previously interrupted small terrane wedged against the Yilgarn craton. In other cases, researchers attempting to reconstruct the supercontinent Rodinia suggested a possible connection between Australia-Antarctica and the proto-North American continent Laurentia (the SWEAT and AUSWUS hypotheses), but in 2003 paleomagnetic data from the Albany-Fraser orogeny suggested that Australia and Laurentia were at different latitudes.

== See also ==
- List of orogenies
- Geology of Australia
