= Mangaroon orogeny =

The Mangaroon orogeny was an orogenic event in what is now Western Australia between 1.68 and 1.62 billion years ago in the Proterozoic, preserved in the rocks of the large Gascoyne Province.

== Interpretation of events ==
Beginning 1.7 billion years ago, widespread sedimentary rocks deposited across the Gascoyne Province, including fluvial conglomerate and sandstone. These are the protoliths of the Pooranoo Metamorphics and span Errabiddy Shear Zone, Limejuice Zone and Mangaroon Zone. During the Mangaroon orogeny, huge volumes of granite belonging to the Durlacher Supersuite intruded rocks in the Mangaroon Zone as high-grade metamorphism and deformation occurred. The Pooranoo Metamorphics reached amphibolite-grade on the sequence of metamorphic facies becoming gneiss. Like the Capricorn orogeny, the Mangaroon orogeny is interpreted as an intracontinental deformation event due to distant collisions at the edges of the continent rather than an ocean-closing event.

== See also ==
- List of orogenies
- Geology of Australia
