= Kararan orogeny =

Event in South Australia

The Kararan orogeny was an orogenic event in the Gawler craton of South Australia during the Proterozoic between 1.57 and 1.55 billion years ago which reworked rocks metamorphosed during the Kimban orogeny.

== See also ==
- List of orogenies
- Geology of Australia
