= Glenburgh orogeny =

The Glenburgh orogeny was a mountain building event in the Proterozoic from 2.0 to 1.96 billion years ago. The Glenburgh Terrane collided with the Yilgarn craton, creating the Errabiddy Shear Zone. Mineral lineation from the orogeny is common although it is sometimes overprinted in greenschist by the later Capricorn orogeny.

== See also ==
- List of orogenies
- Geology of Western Australia
