= Capricorn orogeny =

The Capricorn orogeny was an orogenic event in what is now Western Australia, following the collision of the Pilbara Craton and the Glenburgh Terrane with the Yilgarn craton during the Glenburgh orogeny. Spanning one billion years, the Capricorn orogeny is marked by widespread deformation and intracratonal reworking.

== Sequence of events ==
The Leake Springs Metamorphics are a group of siliclastic metasedimentary rocks covering the northern two-thirds of the Gascoyne Province and grading into low-grade metasedimentary rocks of the Wyloo Group in the north. During the Capricorn orogeny, these rocks were intruded by the tonalite, monzogranite, quartz diorite and syenogranite of the Moorarie Supersuite (including the Minnie Creek batholith). Throughout the orogeny, numerous phases of metamorphism took place, such as the reworking of older Archean granite and gneiss in the Paradise Zone and Mooloo Zone between 1.805 and 1.80 billion years ago. During a second phase, the Yarlarwheelor Gneiss Complex and Errabiddy Shear Zone saw reactivation of faults and the transformation of psammite schist to chlorite-sericite schist. A third event, preserved in the Limejuice Zone produced high-grade gneiss rock fabrics. Between 1990 and 2004, some geologists proposed that the orogeny resulted from the collision of the Yilgarn and Pilbara cratons. Later, the Geological Survey of Western Australia proposed that the event was mid-continent deformation due to distant, continent-edge collision events.

== See also ==
- List of orogenies
- Geology of Australia
