= Edmundian orogeny =

The Edmundian orogeny is a preserved low-grade reworking of sedimentary to metasedimentary rocks in the Gascoyne Complex of Western Australia from 1.68 billion to 1.46 billion years ago.

== See also ==
- List of orogenies
