= Barramundi (disambiguation) =

Barramundi (Lates calcarifer) is a saltwater fish of the Indian and western Pacific oceans also called the Asian sea bass. Barramundi, meaning "large-scaled river fish", may also refer to:

Australian names for fish

- Barramundi or Gulf saratoga (Scleropages jardinii), freshwater fish of the Gulf of Carpentaria drainage system
- Barramundi or southern saratoga (Scleropages leichardti), freshwater fish of the Fitzroy River system
- Barramundi cod or humpback grouper (Cromileptes altivelis), saltwater fish of the western Pacific Ocean
- Rock barramundi or mangrove red snapper (Lutjanus argentimaculatus), saltwater fish of the Indian and western Pacific oceans
- Waigeo barramundi or Waigieu seaperch (Psammoperca waigiensis), saltwater fish of the Indian and western Pacific oceans

Other

- "Barramundi", codename for the Ford Barra engine introduced in 2002
- Barramundi orogeny, orogenic event between 1.88 and 1.84 billion years ago affecting Mount Isa and Pine Creek orogenic domains in Australia
- Barramundi Gorge or Maguk, waterfall in Kakadu National Park, Northern Territory, Australia
- "Barramundi", song from This Mortal Coil's 1984 album, It'll End in Tears
- Barramundi, final tribe in Survivor: The Australian Outback, a 2001 reality television series

== See also ==
- Barramunda or Australian lungfish (Neoceratodus forsteri)
- Barry Munday, 2010 American comedy film
