= Olarian orogeny =

The Olarian orogeny was a metamorphic and orogenic event in the Gawler craton of Australia in the Proterozoic. A subduction zone off the coast of proto-Australia and the collision of the Warumpi Province led to metamorphism.

== See also ==
- List of orogenies
