= Musgrave orogeny =

The Musgrave orogeny was one of three Mesoproterozoic orogenic events affecting the Musgrave Province in Central Australia between 1.22 and 1.12 billion years ago. Earlier, 1.29 billion years ago the Musgrave Province formed as the North, West and South Australian cratons converged. The granites of the Pitjantjatjara Supersuite intruded during the event at high temperatures above 1000 degrees Celsius. The event is interpreted as an intracontinental orogeny due to significant upwelling of heat and material from the mantle.

== See also ==
- List of orogenies
- Geology of Australia
