= Sleaford orogeny =

The Sleaford orogeny was an event in the assembly of the Gawler craton, which now underlies the Eyre Peninsula in South Australia. Between 2.46 and 2.41 billion years ago in the Proterozoic, the Sleaford and Mulgathing complexes emplaced among the older 3.15 billion year old Archean Cooyerdoo Granite 2.82 billion year old Coolanie Gneiss with sedimentary, felsic and ultramafic igneous rocks. The overlapping Sleaford orogeny caused deformation and greenschist and granulite-grade metamorphism on the sequence of metamorphic facies.

== See also ==
- List of orogenies
