= Dabie-Sulu orogeny =

The Dabie-Sulu orogeny also termed Qinling-Dabie-Sulu or Dabie Shan-Sulu was a mountain building event in the Triassic from 240 to 220 million years ago caused by the collision of the North China and South China cratons. It extends 2000 kilometers (1250 miles) from the Tanlu fault zone between Shanghai and Wuhan in modern-day China to the Qaidam basin north of the Tibetan Plateau.

== Description ==
Typically 50 to 100 kilometers wide the orogeny contains the small South Qinling terrane. In fact, the Dabie-Sulu orogen is part of the larger Central China orogeny, extending through the Kunlun Range, Qinling Range, Tongbai-Dabie Range. Although it is offset by the Tan-Lu fault zone, it stretches through the Sulu region of the Shandong Peninsula and reaches South Korea.

The orogeny is the largest area ultrahigh pressure metamorphic belt in the world. Low-temperature, but high-pressure conditions led rocks to reach eclogite-grade on the sequence of metamorphic facies. The added presence of diamonds and felsic gneiss indicates deep burial up to 100 kilometers below the surface.

The China Continental Scientific Drilling Project was approved in China's ninth Five-Year Plan in 1997, with the CCSD-1 well inaugurated on 25 June 2001 drilling into the Dabie-Sulu orogen at Lianyungang City, Jiangsu Province. The goal of the project throughout the 2000s was to collect data about rheology and mantle mineralogy, as well as study processes similar to those in the center of the Himalayas, but at lower cost.

== See also ==
- List of orogenies
- Geology of China
