= Late Ruker orogeny =

The Late Ruker orogeny, also known as the Nimrod orogeny, was a mountain building event around 1 billion years ago in the Proterozoic. Large portions of West Antarctica were added to the continent during this event. The orogeny was marked by subsidence, sedimentation and underwater volcanic eruptions along the proto-Pacific Ocean margin of proto-Antarctica. This melted some older igneous plutonic rocks and metamorphic rocks and caused some new metamorphism.

Red beds were deposited and are now preserved in the Ritscher Upland of Queen Maud Land. Stromatolite carbonate beds and quartz arenite in the Shackleton Range serves as evidence for a stable platform and epicratonic sea during the period.

== See also ==
- List of orogenies
- Geology of Antarctica
