= Yapungku orogeny =

The Yapungku orogeny occurred in what is now Western Australia in the Proterozoic 1.79 billion years ago. Preserved in the Rudall Complex of the Paterson Orogen, the event led to thrust stacking of sedimentary and volcanic rocks, granite intrusion, paragneiss formation and metamorphism up to granulite-grade on the sequence of metamorphic facies.

== See also ==
- List of orogenies
