= Isan orogeny =

The Isan orogeny affected the Mount Isa Inlier in what is now Australia between 1.65 and 1.50 billion years ago in the Proterozoic. Deformation from the event is widespread and complex in the Eastern Fold Belt, with no consensus on timing and sub-events as of 2017. To date, most research has focused on the Snake Creek Anticline, Selwyn zone and Mary Kathleen Domain. At the end of the orogeny, massive A-type granitoids intruded with the Williams-Naraku Batholith.

== See also ==
- List of orogenies
