= Great Falls orogeny =

The Great Falls orogeny, or the Big Sky orogeny (in reference to its last phase found in the Tobacco Root Mountains), was a mountain building event in the Proterozoic preserved in what is now Montana and northwestern Wyoming. It is one of several orogenis involved in the assembly of the proto-North American continent Laurentia. Beginning around 1.86 billion years ago the Hearne craton and Wyoming craton began to migrate closer together with the closure of the Medicine Hat Ocean.

In the main phase of the Great Falls orogeny, arc magmatism and anatexis occurred as the Montana metasedimentary terrane was buried beneath the Hearne craton (sometimes called the Medicine Hat-Hearne crust). The Big Sky orogeny refers to the last phase of the orogeny when the metasedimentary terrane was deformed, metamorphosed, melted and preserved in the Tobacco Root Mountains.

== See also ==
- List of orogenies
- Geology of Wyoming
- Geology of Montana
