= Transamazonian orogeny =

The Transamazonian orogeny was a mountain building event in the Paleoproterozoic, affecting what is now the São Francisco Craton and Guyana Shield. During the orogeny from 2.14 to 1.94 billion years ago two small Archean proto-continents—including the greenstone belt-dominated Gavião Block and the calc-alkaline charnockite and enderbite-dominated Jequié Block—collided. The Contendas-Jacobina Lineament represents a suture zone where the collision occurred and the Gavião Block partially subducted under the Jequié Block. At the same time, another small continental fragment, the Serrinha Block, may have collided as well and was extensively reworked and metamorphosed, with orthogneiss and migmatite reaching amphibolite-grade on the sequence of metamorphic facies. The Serrinha Block is the basement rock of the Rio Itapicuru granite-greenstone belt. Several magmatic arcs formed between the colliding proto-continent blocks, including the Salvador-Curaçá Belt, Contendas-Mirante Belt, Jacobina-Mundo Novo Belt and Itabuna-Atlantic Belt. To the west of the Gavião Block, the Guanambi-Urandi Batholith formed with monzonite, granite intrusions and syenite, which was subsequently covered by Neoproterozoic sedimentary rocks.

In the Guyana Shield, the Transamazonian orogeny resulted in refolding and reactivation of older tectonic features from the Guriense orogeny, producing horst and graben areas and intense pyroclastic ignimbrite and rhyolite eruptions.

== See also ==
- Geology of Brazil
- Geology of Guyana
- List of orogenies
