= Insel orogeny =

The Insel orogeny was a mountain building event in the late Archean, 2.65 billion years ago, in what is now Antarctica. First identified by geologists in Queen Maud Land and the southern Prince Charles Mountains, the orogeny produced rocks that reached amphibolite-grade on the sequence of metamorphic facies, produced large areas of new continental crust and altered the large areas of older rock. In the 1970s and 1980s, Antarctic researchers Grikurov and Elliot debated whether the Insel Orogeny marked the end of craton building in East Antarctica, or whether the process continued into the Proterozoic.

== See also ==
- List of orogenies
- Geology of Antarctica
