= Geology of Venezuela =

The geology of Venezuela includes ancient Precambrian igneous and metamorphic basement rocks, layered with sedimentary rocks from the Paleozoic and Mesozoic and thick geologically recent Cenozoic sediments with extensive oil and gas.

== Geologic history, stratigraphy and tectonics ==
The oldest rocks in Venezuela formed during the Precambrian and occupy the Guiana shield in the southern tier of the country near Guyana and Brazil, east of the El BaUl swell. In the western Guiana Shield, within the Amazonas Territory, Precambrian Roraima Formation zircon grains have been dated with uranium-lead dating and rubidium-strontium dating. Metamorphism and intrusive activity formed gneiss with sedimentary and igneous protoliths around 1.8 billion years ago. Plutons emplaced granite and tonalite after inferred collision and subduction tectonics until around 1.55 billion years ago. The formation's volcanic rocks were produced 1.74 billion years ago.

Metamorphism was driven in places by the Transamazonian orogeny. Geochemistry research on the Imataca Complex within metaigneous and metasedimentary rocks reaching granulite grade on the sequence of metamorphic facies suggests high temperature decompression, based on assemblages of sillimanite, kyanite, garnet, orthopyroxene, plagioclase and quartz.

=== Paleozoic (539-251 million years ago) ===
The Paleozoic period in Venezuela is primarily exposed in the Andes and the central-western part of the country. Research in the Merida Andes in the 1960s revealed unmetamorphosed sedimentary rocks from the Ordovician, Silurian, Carboniferous and Permian, as well as metamorphosed slate. During the period, North America and South America collided, producing quartz-feldspar gneiss bodies spanning Paria Peninsula into Trinidad. In western Venezuela, geologists have recognized the Apure allochthon, a remnant Paleozoic mountain belt.

=== Mesozoic (251-66 million years ago) ===
The Merida Arch, a remnant mountain range from the Pennsylvanian controlled sedimentation in the Tachira, Barquisimeto and Machiques as well as the Maracaibo and Barinas basins. The basins are primarily filled with Jurassic and Cretaceous shallow water carbonates. Throughout the Mesozoic, Venezuela was a passive margin of the South American continent.

=== Cenozoic (66 million years ago-present) ===
Pull-apart basins began to form, filling with sediments between the Eocene, Oligocene, Miocene and Pliocene. For the most part, Eocene and Oligocene sedimentary rocks survive only in fault-bounded basins.

In the mid-Cenozoic, fragments of basement rock were detached by collision of the South American and Caribbean plate. The El Mango Gneiss formed. More broadly schist and gneiss formed in the accretionary wedge.

During the Miocene and Pliocene, extensive sediments accumulated in the western Guarico Basin and eastern Maturin Basin.

== Oil and gas reserves ==
Venezuela has the largest hydrocarbon deposits of any country. Unlike many deposits around the world, which formed during the Mesozoic or Paleozoic, Venezuela's deposits are dominantly Miocene in age within porous delta and coastal plain sediments.
