= Geology of Brazil =

Brazilian geological provinces: Transamazonas Province, Carajás Province, Amazonas Central Province, Tapajós-Parima Province, Rondônia-Juruena Province, Rio Negro Province, Sunsás Province, São Francisco Shield, Borborema Province, Tocantins Province, Mantiqueira Province, Amazonas Basin, Parnaíba Basin, Parecis Basin and Paraná Basin.

The geology of Brazil includes very ancient craton basement rock from the Precambrian overlain by sedimentary rocks and intruded by igneous activity, as well as impacted by the rifting of the Atlantic Ocean.

== Geologic history, stratigraphy, and tectonics ==
Approximate location of Mesoproterozoic (older than 1.3 Ga) cratons in South America and Africa. The São Luís and the Luis Alves cratonic fragments (Brazil) are shown, but the Arequipa–Antofalla Craton and some minor African cratons are not. Other versions describe the Guiana Shield separated from the Amazonian Shield by a depression, and the Saharan Metacraton as a part of this West African Craton.

Much of the rock underlying Brazil formed during the Precambrian, including the São Francisco Craton which outcrops in Minas Gerais and Bahia. In the Mesoproterozoic, the Rio de la Plata Craton (beneath southern Brazil), the vast Amazonia Craton, and the small São Luis Craton and sections of the Congo Craton which form the basement rock of much of Brazil were joined with Africa.

Earlier, during the Archean, the São Francisco Craton developed between 3.2 and 2.6 billion years ago and grew as microcontinents collided with it, forming a series of mobile belts. The rocks became a craton, a section of stable continental crust by the end of the Trans-amazonian orogeny 1.8 billion years ago. The Borborema Province is beneath areas in the northeast, with Paleoproterozoic craton basement rock originally assembled around even older Archean rocks. It includes three zones. The Zona Transversal is in the central sub-province between the Pernambuco Shear Zone and the São Francisco Craton, displaying 2.2 billion year old gneiss, a suite of metavolcanic, metasedimentary and metaplutonic rocks as well as pluton formations from 640 to 540 million years ago. Uranium-lead dating has revealed two periods of acid magmatism in central Brazil, which produced the Goias tin province in granite and rhyolite.

The Pernambuco Shear Zone, or lineament, is a steeply-dipping ductile shear zone formed 600 million years ago during the Brasiliano orogeny. The zone has two 100 meter wide mylonite zones surrounding it. The Brasiliano orogeny was a South American extension of the major Pan-African orogeny during a period when the two continents were joined. The proto-South Atlantic opened and then closed with subduction by around 750 million years ago in the Katangan episode. High potassium feldspar granites, gabbro and diorite emplaced following the Pan-African orogeny 600 million years ago in Goias, in central Brazil.

In the northeast, the Brasiliano-Pan-African orogeny period led to reverse-type metamorphism, similar to what is now found in the Himalayas and thrust nappe formations 150 kilometers to the west.

In the southeast of the country, the remnants of two mountain belts record the collision between three sections of continental crust: the Brasilia, São Paulo and Vitoria plates.

=== Paleozoic (539-251 million years ago) ===
Convergent plate tectonics within the continent of Gondwana had a major influence in the Paleozoic. The Maranhao intracratonic basin in Piaui and Maranhao, close to the mouth of the Amazon spans 600,000 square kilometers and filled with 2.5 kilometers of sandstone and shale from the Cambrian through the Devonian. The sequence is capped with Mississippian, continental, marine and fluvial sandstones.

With South America and Africa still conjoined, glaciers advanced across the region in the late Paleozoic. Glacial grooves and erosion marks scored the igneous, metamorphic and sedimentary rocks in the Parana Basin. Diamictite and sandstone from this period are common in the southeast. The Early Permian Rio Bonito Formation in the Parana Basin contains fossil charcoal left by wildfires.

=== Mesozoic (251-66 million years ago) ===
Drilling in the Parana Basin and sampling of dikes around São Paulo revealed that the Serra Geral basalts and Kaoko basalts in Namibia both formed at the same time—121 million years ago—marking the beginning of the rifting open of the South Atlantic. Elsewhere, flood basalts and hypabyssal rocks from the Mesozoic mark the opening of the ocean in Maranha in the north. The Pernambuco Shear Zone in the northeast reactivated during the breakup of the supercontinent Pangea in the Cretaceous. In the late Cretaceous, kimberlite, carbonatite, olivine melilitite and tuffaceous diatreme intruded the Sao Francisco Craton. Magmatic activity also took place in the Borborema Province in the northeast through the Jurassic and Cretaceous. For almost 50 million years after the region rifted apart from Africa, relatively little material eroded. But analysis of offshore sediments indicates a rapid increase at the boundary with Paleogene.

=== Cenozoic (66 million years ago-present) ===
Continued crustal extension tied to the opening of the Atlantic continued into the Cenozoic. Shear and extension related fractures control water well productivity in São Paulo. Along the coastline of Rio de Janeiro, an alkaline igneous complex intruded older Precambrian rocks with nepheline syenite, gabbro, shonkinite and clinopyroxenite. Alkali basalt erupted in Paraiba and Rio Grande do Norte. Brittle deformation and dike swarms accompanied the formation of the Ponta Grossa Arch in the Parana Basin, within sandstone and siltstone of the Piramboia and Botucatu formations and the Serra Geral Formation tholeiitic basalt. In the northeast, the 130 kilometer long Pereiro Massif was uplifted.

In the Paleogene, and in the early and late Miocene, sea levels dropped, recorded in sedimentary rocks in Para in the northeast. Simultaneously, turbidites flooded into the offshore Sao Tome deep sea basin.

Within the Holocene, a short run climate change associated with the draining of a glacial lake is recorded in Brazilian stalagmites, indicating an intense South American summer monsoon.

== Natural resource geology ==
Formed between the Mesozoic and Cenozoic, Brazil has numerous offshore basins that contain oil, related to the rifting of the Atlantic Ocean. The Sergipe-Alagoas Basin is an example of Aptian age shale, conglomerate and sandstone deposited in the final phase of rifting, while the Miranga, Aracas, Dom Joao and Agua Grande fields reflect mid-Mesozoic lake-bed shales, with high oil-content Jurassic sandstones above them.
