= Ivanpah orogeny =

Mountain building event in the Proterozoic

The Ivanpah orogeny was a mountain building event in the Proterozoic from 1.71 to 1.70 billion years ago, preserved in the Ivanpah Mountains and the rocks of some mountain ranges in western Arizona and eastern California. The event is closely related to the Yavapai orogeny and may have had the same underlying causes. Foliated intrusive rocks including granite-gneiss, augen gneiss as well as amphibolite and granulite-grade metamorphism on the sequence of metamorphic facies offers evidence about the extent of deformation.

The orogeny occurred in four pulses, at 1760, 1740, 1700 and 1670 million years ago (mya). The pulse at 1670 Mya accounts for most of the fabric and migmatization of the rock. Low-pressure (granulite facies) metamorphism at this time is interpreted as extension of overthickened crust.

== See also ==
- List of orogenies
- Geology of Arizona
- Geology of California
