= Humboldt orogeny =

Geologic formation in Antarctica

The Humboldt orogeny was a widespread mountain building event, preserved in rocks throughout much of East Antarctica including Mac. Robertson Land and the Humboldt Mountains of Queen Maud Land. The event deformed miogeoclinal deposits.

== See also ==
- List of orogenies
