= Rayner orogeny =

The Rayner orogeny was a mountain building that thickened the early continental crust (the cratonic nucleus) of what is now East Antarctica 3.5 billion years ago. Rocks preserving the orogeny are found in the rough vicinity of the Scott Mountains between Enderby Land in the north and Kemp Land in the south.

== See also ==
- List of orogenies
