= Miltalie orogeny =

The Miltalie orogeny also termed the Miltalie event was a small orogenic event 400 millions after the Sleaford orogeny in the Proterozoic, indicated by metasedimentary rocks preserved in the Miltalie Gneiss.

== See also ==
- List of orogenies
