= Borchgrevink orogeny =

The Borchgrevink orogeny also termed the Borchgrevink event is a proposed mountain building event in Antarctica in the Devonian and Silurian. The event is recorded by metamorphic rocks in Victoria Land as well as igneous and metamorphic rocks found throughout Marie Byrd Land, Thurston Island and the Antarctic Peninsula.

More than other geological events in Antarctica, whether the Borchgrevink event constitutes an orogeny is a subject of debate among geologists. After initial radiometric dating indicated the event in the late 1960s and into the 1970s, a German expedition in 1981 failed to uncover evidence of deformation and compressional tectonics in North Victoria Land.

== See also ==
- List of orogenies
- Geology of Antarctica
