= Early Ruker orogeny =

The Early Ruker orogeny was a mountain building event from 2.0 to 1.7 billion years ago in the Proterozoic and a key event in the assembly of Antarctica. Much of central Antarctica was added to the nucleus of the continent (in East Antarctica) during this time period. The event resulted in widespread formation of intra-cratonic miogeoclinal basins. Outcrops of rocks in the southern Prince Charles Mountains contain cross-bedded shale, sandstone, conglomerate, mudstone and ironstone. Many of these rocks were deformed and metamorphosed close to the end of the orogeny around 1.7 billion years ago.

== See also ==
- List of orogenies
- Geology of Antarctica
