= East Greenland Orogen =

The East Greenland orogen, also known as East Greenland mountain range, is the linear mountain range along the eastern Greenland coast, from 70 to 82 degrees north latitude.

Geologically, the mountain chain consists of Silurian to early Devonian (490 to 390 million years ago) fold and thrust belts. The rocks of the East Greenland orogen are mostly Cryogenian to Silurian sedimentary rocks overlying a basement of mainly Proterozoic gneisses.

The current mountain range formed as a result of Cenozoic uplift following the opening of the North Atlantic Ocean in the early Eocene (about 55 million years ago).

== See also ==
- Stauning Alps
- Watkins Range
