= Chonos Metamorphic Complex =

- Stratigraphic range: Jurassic
- Type: Complex
- Sub-units: Potranca Formation
- Underlies: Traiguén Formation

Lithology
- Primary: Metasediments including metaturbidite

Location
- Region: Aysén Region
- Country: Chile

Type section
- Named for: Chonos Archipelago

The Chonos Metamorphic Complex is an accretionary complex composed of metamorphic rocks located in western Aysén Region, Chile. The deposition of the sedimentary protoliths occurred in the Triassic and they were later metamorphosed in the Jurassic. The formation has been subdivided into a highly deformed Western belt and an Eastern belt where sedimentary structures are preserved.

Fossils of Late Triassic bivalve species Monotis (Pacimonotis) aff. subcircularis and Lima sp. has been found in Chonos Metamorphic Complex, the first one in the Potranca Formation.
