= Pasadena orogeny =

Mountain building event in the western United States

Geography of Southern California

Pasadena orogeny is a mountain building event in the Western United States. Conventionally it refers to the formation of mountains in mainly Southern California during the Pleistocene and lasting until the present day; originally it referred to the uplift of the San Gabriel Mountains.

The Pasadena orogeny is a major Late Quaternary-modern event of mountain formation, which took place in the middle or perhaps late Pleistocene or to the present-day. It is also known as the "Coast Ranges orogeny" or considered to be part of the Cascadian orogeny or Alpide Orogeny. Finally, the term "Pasadena orogeny" is sometimes applied to all very recent orogenies around the Pacific Ocean. The type location is close to Pasadena, California in the Transverse Ranges, and originally referred to the fast rise of the San Gabriel Mountains recorded there.

During this orogeny mountain ranges such as the San Bernardino Mountains, San Gabriel Mountains, San Jacinto Mountains, Santa Monica Mountains, Santa Ynez Mountains and the Transverse Ranges grew, as did the northern Channel Islands such as Catalina Island and San Clemente Island, the Kettleman Hills anticline in the San Joaquin Valley and the Palos Verdes Hills. Sometimes the concept is limited to the uplift of the Transverse Ranges.

The general uplift of mountains over a length of over 400 kilometres (250 mi) is caused by the collision of the North American Plate with other geologic structures that are attached to the Pacific Plate. This orogeny has resulted in the uplift of mostly north-south trending mountain chains, although some east-west trending uplifts are also found such as the Channel Islands and the Transverse Ranges; much of the uplift took place at the edge of basins. The Pasadena orogeny is accompanied by earthquake activity, which includes tsunami hazards.

Folding accompanying the uplift of the Coast Ranges in Southern California, folding farther north at Morro Bay and the structure of the Santa Barbara Basin and Ventura Basin are consequences of the Pasadena orogeny. The city of Long Beach, California lies within the affected region.
