= Saamian orogeny =

The Saamian orogeny is one of the earliest recognizable events in the formation of the Baltic Shield, between 3.1 and 2.9 billion years ago in the Archean and Proterozoic. The Saamian orogeny is associated with intense igneous activity that produced large granitoid plutons. The event lined up with the Katarchean, a period in which the Earth's crust approached its present thickness and sialic rocks, rich in silica and aluminium, became commonplace.
