= Barramundi orogeny =

The Barramundi orogeny was an orogenic event in what is now Australia between 1.88 and 1.84 billion years ago in the Proterozoic that affected Mount Isa and Pine Creek orogenic domains. Immediately before the orogeny, extension of Archean crust led to widespread basin formation. A large magmatic, granitoid forming event during the orogeny produced rocks with unusually similar chemistry. Other rocks include monzogranites, syenogranites, dacite and rhyolite rich in phenocrysts, ignimbrite sheets, and hornblende-tonalite.

== See also ==
- List of orogenies
