= Geology of Argentina =

The geology of Argentina includes ancient Precambrian basement rock affected by the Grenville orogeny, sediment filled basins from the Mesozoic and Cenozoic as well as newly uplifted areas in the Andes.

== Geologic history, stratigraphy and tectonics ==
The oldest rocks in Argentina date to the Precambrian. Strontium, oxygen and carbon isotope data from carbonate rocks in the Sierra de Pie de Palo are part of an ophiolite unit related to the Grenville orogeny, formed as cover rock in the Appalachian margin of the continent Laurentia around 720 million years ago. These Neoproterozoic age rocks are believed to have formed above much older Archean craton rock. Throughout the late Proterozoic, sections of Argentina were part of a metamorphic mobile belt adjacent to the Brazilian Shield. Regional metamorphism produced scheelite belts and wolframite in parts of San Luis and Cordoba Provinces.

To the north, along the Bolivian border in the Altiplano, drilling has revealed Precambrian Hornblende Granoblastite and biotite Granoblastite formed from magma during the Grenville orogeny 1.05 billion years ago metamorphosed around 530 million years ago. Granitoid and metamorphic rocks elsewhere in the El Cristo area in the southern Tandilia Range experienced intense folding more than two billion years ago and then metamorphosed to almandine grade on the sequence of metamorphic facies 1.8 billion years ago. Brittle deformation, granite emplacement and chloritization occurred in the formation 900 million years ago.

Extremely ancient trace fossils have been found in the Puncoviscana Formation in the northwest, which grades into gneiss, schist and migmatite, as well as conglomerates, pelagic clay and volcanic rocks. Large areas of Argentina were part of the supercontinent Gondwana, inferred from detrital zircon grains.

=== Paleozoic (539-251 million years ago) ===
In the Paleozoic, Argentina was located at a point in western Gondwana where the current African and South American cratons joined. Graywacke samples from the Puncoviscana Formation have zircon age patterns that suggest the crystals eroded out of active-margin mountain belts in the Brazilian Shield.

Ice ages occurred in the Carboniferous and Early Permian in two main glacial periods. Carboniferous glacial deposits are well preserved in the San Eduardo Group in the western side of the Precordillera. The discovery of glacial deposits and marine sediments far east of the main deposits suggests that global changes in climate and latitude played a bigger role than altitude in the ice ages.

The Rio Blanco Basin and Paganzo Basin in western Argentina include sedimentary sequences that from bottom to top include marine sediments, an erosional surface with conglomerate, fluvial and shallow marine deposits, shale and diamictite, as well as shallow marine and glacial outwash deposits.

=== Mesozoic (251-66 million years ago) ===
During the Mesozoic, basins formed in what would become the Andean foothills, due to strike-slip movement and continental extension. The Choiyoi Group is a remnant of bimodal magmatism along a Paleozoic terrane suture. As the breakup of Gondwana began, narrow half-grabens filled with volcaniclastic rocks and the Pampa de Agnia Basin formed along the Gastre fault system. The Magallenes Basin experienced rifting and the Chon Aike province witnessed intraplate volcanism during the acceleration of the breakup around 180 to 165 million years ago, as the Weddell Sea opened. Explosive volcanism occurred in back arc basins through the Jurassic and low oxygen conditions prevailed in the Neuquen Basin sedimentary environment.

Compressional tectonic forces were the norm in Argentine Tierra del Fuego. The volcanite and breccia of the Lemaire Formation, deep marine andesite turbidite of the Yahgan Formation, and slope mudstones of the Beauvoir Formation were metamorphosed in the Rocas Verdes Marginal Basin. The Malvinas and Austral basins originated during uplift of the region in the Campanian.

=== Cenozoic (66 million years ago-present) ===
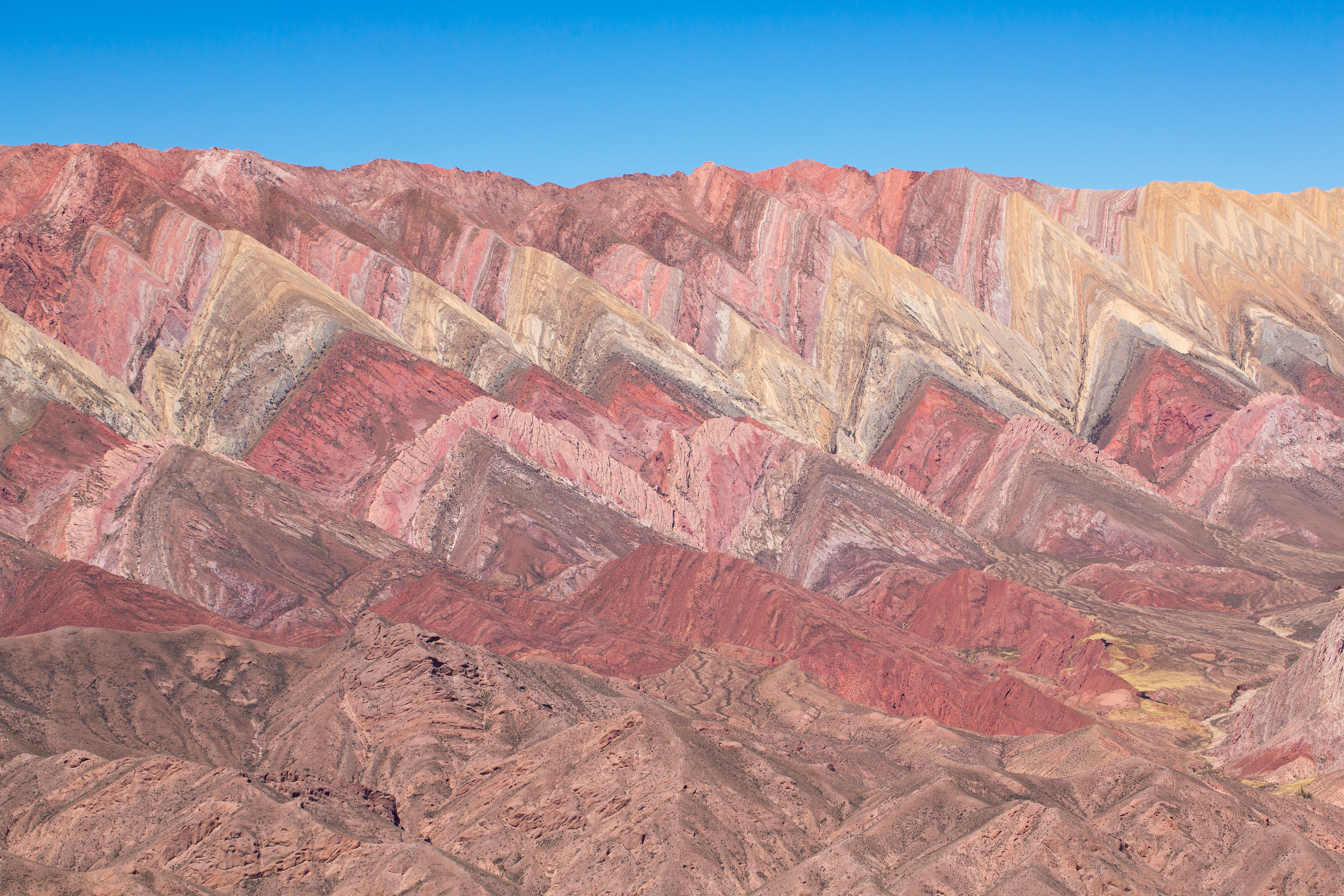
Tilted strata of the Yacoraite Formation at Serranía de Hornocal in northernmost Argentina. The Andean orogeny caused the tilting of these originally horizontal strata.

The Andean orogeny has been a dominant process through the Cenozoic in Argentina. Rifting and strike-slip faulting in weak Cretaceous magmatic arc rocks was reactivated with the subduction of the Nazca Plate under South America around nine million years ago. Uplift began around seven million years ago in the Sierra Pampeanas, a group of reverse fault-bounded Precambrian and Paleozoic rocks in the central Andes foreland basin. To the south, in Tierra del Fuego, turbidites accumulated in the basins formed in the late Cretaceous, producing the Paleocene Río Claro Group, the Eocene La Despedida Group and the Oligocene Cabo Domingo Group. Outside of Antarctica, the chronology of the Patagonian glaciers is the best documented in the Southern Hemisphere. Glaciation began around seven million years ago in the Miocene and Pliocene. A sequence of eight glaciations peaked with the Great Patagonian Glaciations in the early Pleistocene. Paleosols and loess formed in the Pampas, very similar to sediments in northern China although less well preserved.
