= Kanimblan Orogeny =

Ancient Australian mountain-building event

The Kanimblan orogeny was a mountain-building event in eastern Australia toward the end of Early Carboniferous time (about 318 million years ago). It was a terminal orogenic episode forming the Lachlan Fold Belt, which was also known as the Lachlan Geosyncline before the advent of the plate tectonics theory.

Uplift and deformation occurred in a 1,000 km belt extending from Tasmania to Cape York. However the original width was 2,000 to 3,000 km wide, with the excess size absorbed by folding and thrust faulting.

The Kanimblan orogeny also affected the Tasman Geosyncline, which is aligned parallel with the Kanimblan orogen.
