= Kimban orogeny =

The Kimban orogeny, also termed the Strangways orogeny, affected the Gawler craton in what is now Australia between 1.73 and 1.69 billion years ago in the Proterozoic. As the most widespread orogenic event in the craton's evolution, the Kimban orogeny led to widely variable metamorphism included granulite and greenschist-grade on the sequence of metamorphic facies, preserved in the Tunkillia, Moody and Middlecamp rock suites. The Moody Suite formed late in the orogeny and was intruded with hornblende-rich granitoids and muscovite-rich leucogranites.

== See also ==
- List of orogenies
