= Madre de Dios terrane =

Distinct fragment of Earth's crust in southwestern Patagonia

Madre de Dios terrane is a distinct fragment of Earth's crust in southwestern Patagonia. Subduction made the Madre de Dios terrane collide and accrete to Patagonia (then part of Gondwana) in the Mesozoic. This accretion is thought to have happened at a different location than today and the current location of the terrane is would be the result of displacement along dextral faults. The terrane is made up of three distinct units:

- Denaro Complex
- Torlton Limestone
- Duque de York Complex is made up of pelites, greywackes and conglomerates. All these sediments are thought to be derived from a continent or microcontinent. Duque de York Complex was metamorphosed before the Cretaceous intrusions of the South Patagonian Batholith, as is also likely the case of the two other units.
