= Tuhua orogeny =

Mountain-building process in New Zealand

The Tuhua orogeny was a regional orogeny between 370 and 330 million years ago, now preserved in the Fiordland region of New Zealand. Early Paleozoic rocks such as Ordovician greywacke, slate and paragneiss in the Buller terrane, weakly metamorphosed greenschist and sub-greenschist rocks, Cambrian mafic volcanics, Ordovician limestone and Silurian clastic rocks were all deformed and metamorphosed. In addition, between 380 and 250 million years ago, metasediments reached amphibolite grade in the sequence of metamorphic facies.

In 1978, G.W. Grindley proposed that the Tuhua orogeny emplaced the Central Belt as a stack of nappe formations, with recumbent folding, thrusting and axial plane schistosity. The first rocks to be affected, like the Silurian Baton Formation and the Constant Gneiss were later intruded by the Tuhua Intrusive Group granitoids in the second phase of the orogeny during the Devonian.
