= Lopian orogeny =

Archean orogeny

The Lopian orogeny (also known as the Rebolian orogeny) was a mountain building event that affected the Baltic Shield during the Archean, between 2.9 and 2.6 billion years ago. The Kola-Belomorian gneiss and Karelian granitoid-greenstone terrane both formed during this time.
