= North Atlantic Craton =

Archaean craton exposed in Greenland, Labrador, and northwestern Scotland

The North Atlantic Craton (NAC) is an Archaean craton exposed in southern West Greenland, the Nain Province in Labrador, and the Lewisian complex in northwestern Scotland. The NAC is bounded by the Nagssugtoqidian orogen to the north and the 1.8–1.87 Ga Ketilidan–Makkovik mobile belt to the south. The latter can be linked to the Lewisian-Malin boundary in Scotland, which in turn can be linked to the Transscandinavian Igneous Belt in Baltica.

Palaeoproterozoic mobile belts surround the continental blocks and cratonic fragments of the NAC. Throughout the Mesoproterozoic, Neoproterozoic, and Mesozoic (1350–550 Ma), when these blocks still formed a coherent craton, repeated continental extension resulted in lithospheric thinning. The NAC finally broke up at c. 60 Ma with the opening of the Labrador Sea.

Ultramafic magmatism has occurred continuously in the NAC for almost 3 billion years, but kimberlite-producing magmatism has only occurred in two stages: in the Neoproterozoic (c. 600–550 Ma) in the northern NAC and in the Jurassic (c. 200–150 Ma) in the southern NAC. Magmatism during the Neoproterozoic was caused by either the opening of the Iapetus Ocean, lithospheric thinning along a fracture zone, or the appearance of a mantle plume. A rift system that developed during the Mesozoic began to fraction the NAC, and the initial stages of the break-up of the NAC produced the kimberlite and carbonatite deposits along the Labrador Sea.

In Greenland the NAC is primarily made of tonalite–trondhjemite–granodiorite orthogneisses separated and obscured by supracrustal belts, anorthosite complexes, and granite intrusions. A series of terranes have been distinguished in Greenland: north of the Frederikshåb Isblink Glacier. The Akia, Isukasia, and Kapisilik terranes probably collided c. 2950 Ma in the Isukasia orogeny, although events are masked by Neoarchaean overprinting. The Færingehavn, Tre Brødre, and Tasiusarsuaq terranes merged c. 2800–2700 Ma in the Tasiusarsuaq orogeny, although these terranes were affected by Neoarchaean folding and deformation. In the Kapisilik orogeny c. 2650–2580 Ma terranes around the Godthåbsfjord, mostly north of Nuuk, were accreted along the Iivinnguit fault. South of Frederikshåb Isblink the Paamiut and Neria blocks probably collided c. 2850–2830 Ma in the Paamiut orogeny. They in turn collided with the Sioraq block and Tasiusarsuaq terranes 2760–270 Ma in the Tasiusarsuaq orogeny.
