= Geology of Suriname =

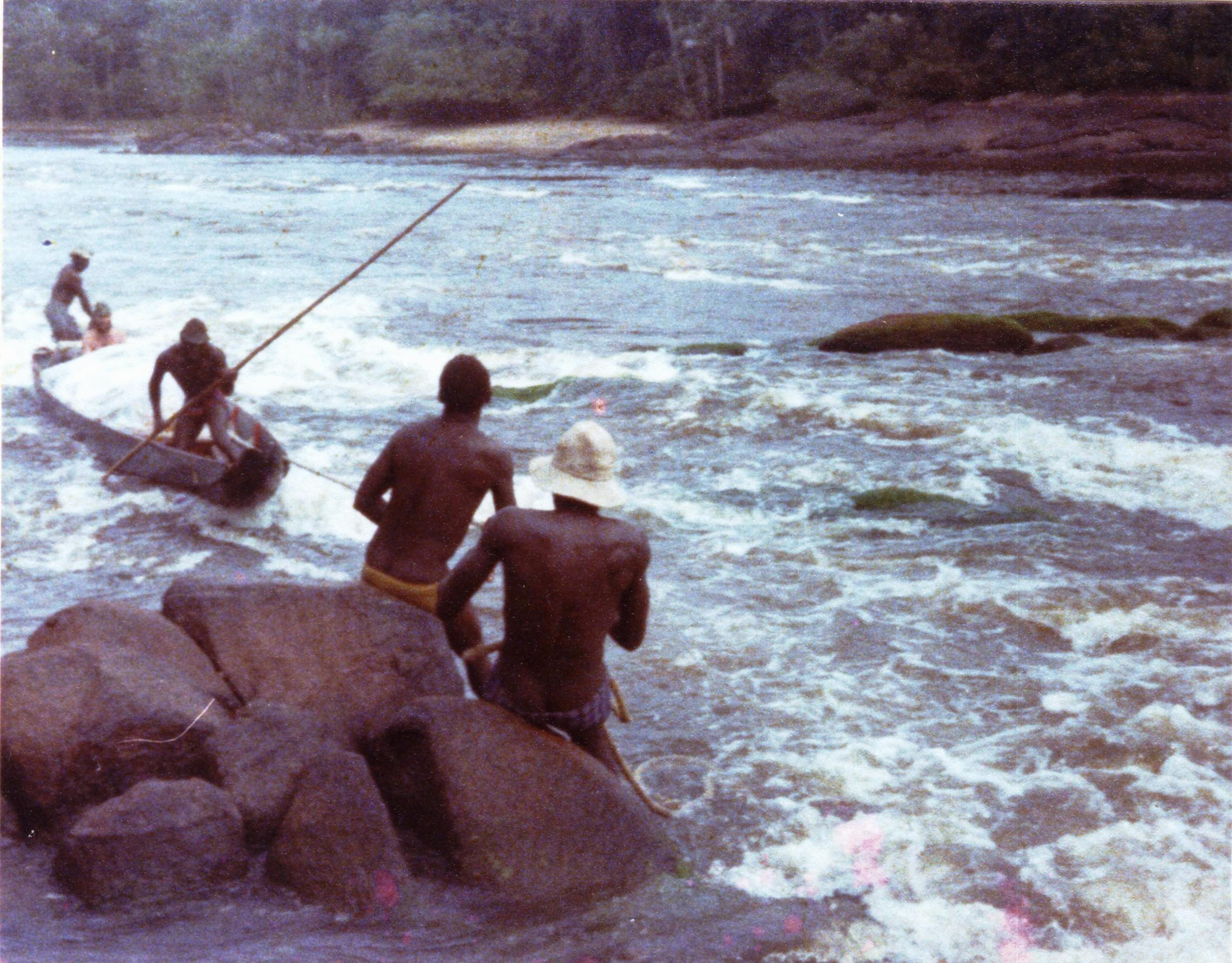
Standing in the Marowijne River

The geology of Suriname is predominantly formed by the Guyana Shield, which spans 90% of its land area. Coastal plains account for the remaining ten percent. Most rocks in Suriname date to the Precambrian. These crystalline basement rocks consists of granitoid and acid volcanic rocks with enclaves of predominantly low-grade metamorphic, geosynclinal rocks in the Marowijne area and of probably considerably older rocks in the Falawatra group of the Bakhuisgebirge and the Coronie area. There are also small, scattered bodies of gabbro and ultramafitite. These are about the same age as the granite and volcanics. It has been found that the construction of the basement was largely created during the final phase of the Trans-Amazonian Orogeny Cycle, about 1.9 billion years ago. This cycle has had a significant influence on the geology of Suriname, characterized by sedimentation, metamorphosis, corrugation and magmatism.

Young sediments cover the northern 20% of the country. They exist from south to north and from old to young from the Coesewine, Coropina and Demarara formations. The older Onverdacht formation is only accessible at Moengo. In the coastal area, the three first mentioned formations are accessible in the savannah belt, the old coastal plain and the marshy young coastal plain. They show a slight, northward slope. The late Pleistocene Coropina Formation and the Holocene Demerara Formation consist of clay mud banks set up in a lagoon region with zigzagging complexes (beach walls) formed of sand and shells. The Coesewijne Formation in the savannah belt consists of coarse, unsorted sands with kaolinite clays. These are probably deposited by braided streams and possibly partly in alluvial deltas. The Coesewijne formation is of Pliocene age. The Onverdacht Formation consists of unsorted sands and kaolinite clays and is covered with bauxite on the surface at Moengo, with subordinate bauxites at Onverdacht. This formation forms old hills protected by the bauxite cover against erosion around which the younger formations have been deposited.

== Early geological surveys ==
The first known geological survey in Suriname dates back to 1720. Friederich Voltz carried out systematic geological research for the first time in 1853. This research was conducted along the lower reaches of the major rivers. In 1888, the first overview map of Suriname with geological data was published by Karl Martin. Until 1900 the interest was focused on gold. Until the 20th century, interest in the geology of the country usually had a more or less local and incidental character. In 1931 R. IJzerman collected all geological research from the period 1853 - 1930 in his dissertation, it gives a fairly complete picture of the geology of Suriname and is provided with a geological overview.

== Geological distribution ==
=== Coastal plain ===
The fertile coastal plain consists of marine clay deposits, weathering products from the Andean mountain range that reached the coast of Suriname via the Amazon River and the Guiana Current. The coastline is mobile because land is washed away repeatedly under the influence of storms and currents.

The knowledge of the geology of the Surinamese coastal plain has increased in the 20th century. In 1931 IJzerman gave a general description of the sediments that occur in the foreland. He distinguished two layers of groups: the fluvio-marine deposits, in which clays and sands occur and the older continental alluvium, for a large part consisting of coarse white, sometimes humus-bearing sands. The fluvio-marine deposits lie in a belt immediately along the coast and the continental alluvium comes to the surface in a belt behind it, wedging against the rocks of the Guiana Shield. The geologist Jan Zonneveld, who worked at the Centraal Bureau Luchtkartering in Paramaribo, around 1950, after studying the use of water level profiles, field research and the interpretation of aerial photographs, was of the opinion that on the surface not two, but three elements should be distinguished, namely from north to south:

- A young coastal plain just above sea level
- An "old coastal plain", lying on a slightly higher level
- A slightly undulating plain, bordered to the south by the hill country and usually called the "Savannah belt" or "Zanderijbelt".

Some authorities still distinguish a fourth element, namely "the domestic remaining highlands".

=== Inland lowlands ===
The low terrains between the mountains show a "multi-convex" relief over large expanses, which consists of countless low bulging hills. The hills have a striking similarity in top height. The different top levels are arranged in a stepwise manner and can be followed along the river in an upstream direction. They are believed to be remnants of earlier flattening. This stepwise succession of plains must have been achieved because the interior has undergone a tectonic upheaval from time to time, which forced the rivers to cut downward, after which surface formation could occur again. A large part of the erosion material was deposited in the falling coastal area. The fragmentation of the stepped relief into a "multiconvex" hill landscape must have taken place during the last part of the Pleistocene.

=== Mountain range ===
The mountainous region of Suriname forms a 'central core' from which foothills radiate in different directions. In the northern part of the country, the Brownsberg, the Hok A Hingeberg, the Nassau mountain range and the Lely mountain range are striking elements. Outside the actual mountain ranges, the lowlands, there are various isolated mountains. Some of these are: the Tebu, the Roosevelt peak and the Voltzberg. Some of these mountains have flat shapes, for example Table Mountain in the Tafelberg Nature Reserve. Table Mountain consists of a plate of Roraima sandstone. The Roraima Formation only occurs on Table Mountain and in the Emma Range. The Brownsberg, the Bakhuis, Hok A Hin-, Nassau and Lely Mountains are characterized by plateaus that consist of laterite and local bauxite crusts.

=== Savanna in the interior ===
In Suriname, savanna areas occur both in the northern lowlands and in the more hilly areas of the interior. The savannas of Suriname probably owe their origin to the savanna climate that dominated 10,000 years ago. The current ecosystem of the savanna changes through human activities such as sand excavations.

There are three areas that are characterized by the presence of savannas:

- The almost east-west zone where the Coesewijne series connects part of the old coastal plain in the area of Moengo and Albina in the east. This belt extending across the whole of Suriname is also called the savanna belt
- A zone located to the south of the "savanna belt" between Kwakoegron and the Brokopondo Reservoir
- A large area in the upstream part of the Sipaliwini called the Sipaliwini Savanna. These savannas continue in Brazil.

On sandstone, granite and laterite caps, there are smaller, more or less individually occurring savannahs here and there.

The savannas cover about one percent of the Surinamese landscape. Approximately one fifth of the known plant species of Suriname occur in these areas. Savannas can be classified on the basis of the vegetation. There are bush and grass savannas and savanna forest, the latter is distinguished by the higher and denser vegetation.

== Natural resource geology ==
The Suriname Planatlas of 1988 mentions the following mineral resources:

- Primary gold, usually in quartz veins. The expectation is that reasonable possibilities exist for the discovery of primary gold in the rocks of the Marowijne group.
- Alluvial gold, residual for example in laterite caps as well as in gravel layers in creek and riverbeds
- Colluvial gold, residual for example in laterite caps
- Bauxite
- Oil
- Tin, tantalite, amblygonite (a lithium mineral) and beryl
- Laterite iron ore, of which large reserves occur in Suriname, which for the time being cannot be profitably exploited due to processing problems and high transport costs.
- Chromium and manganese accumulations, extraction is not viable due to clay reserves and / or processing problems and high transport costs
- Copper, it is expected that larger occurrences in the rocks of the Marowijne group can be found
- Kyanite occurrences are being investigated
- Large reserves of kaolin among the bauxite layers
- White sand and feldspar, applicable in the glass industry
- Stone chips can be used for road paving and in the concrete industry
- Gravel and shredded sand finds application in house and road construction
- Granite has potential as an export product.

== Geological Mining Service ==
In Suriname, research into the soil and geology is mainly conducted by the Geological Mining Service. Geological research is often not easy because a large part of the country is difficult to reach and is covered with dense forests. This service is also responsible for stimulating mining in general. In 2013, Surinamese institutions in collaboration with Brazil worked on a mapping project at the southern border of the country in the Sipaliwini district. The project will lead to the implementation of new topographic, hydrographic, geological, geophysical and structural maps. The new maps will be composed with the most modern tools that Brazil has. The project is being carried out by the Suriname Environmental and Mining Foundation together with the Geological Mining Service (GMD), the Anton de Kom University of Suriname and the Geological Service of Brazil.
