= Nagssugtoqidian orogeny =

Late Paleoproterozoic mountain-building event in Greenland

The Nagssugtoqidian orogeny was a late Paleoproterozoic mountain-building event that affected Greenland during the period 1.91 to 1.77 Ga. The orogenic belt formed during this event marks the northern boundary of the mainly Archaean North Atlantic craton. It was first recognised by Ramberg in 1949, based on its effect on the Kangaamiut dike swarm. The subsequent recognition of magmatic terranes representing past island arcs and two potential sutures representing now vanished subduction zones within the belt, have enabled its interpretation in terms of plate tectonics.
