= Gascoyne Complex =

Granite and metamorphic rock in Western Australia

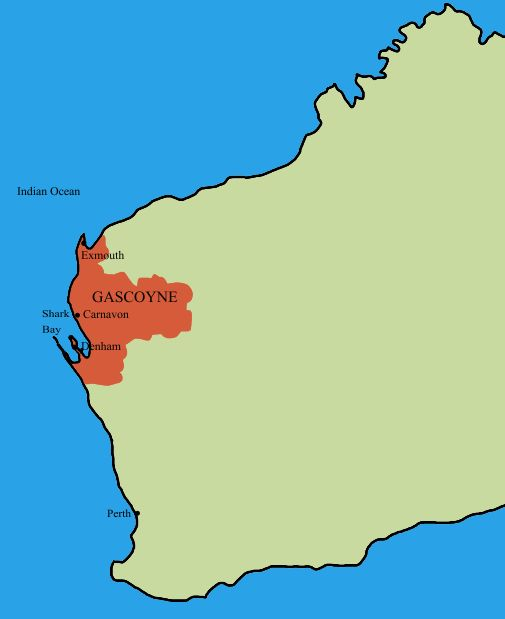
Map of the Gascoyne region

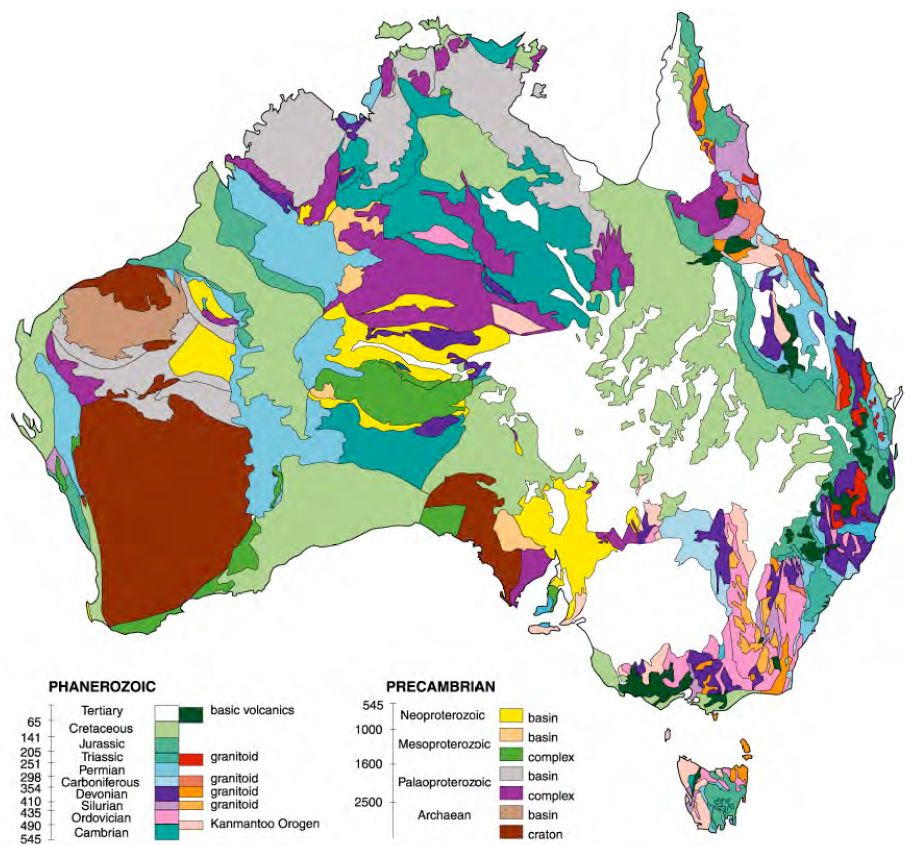
Geologic map of Australia, showing the Gascoyne Complex in purple

The Gascoyne Complex is a polydeformed Proterozoic terrane composed of granite and metamorphic rocks in central-western Western Australia, exposed at the western end of the Capricorn Orogeny. It forms part of the 1,000 kilometres (620 mi) Capricorn Orogenic belt, which separates the Archean Pilbara craton to the north from the Yilgarn craton to the south.

The Gascoyne Complex is separated from the Yilgarn craton to the south by a major fault, the Errabiddy Shear Zone. To the east and northeast rocks of the complex are overlain unconformably by fine-grained Mesoproterozoic sedimentary rocks of the Edmund Basin and Collier Basin (formerly known as the Bangemall Basin). Several inliers of granite within these sedimentary basins also belong to the Gascoyne Complex. To the west, the Gascoyne Complex is overlain unconformably by sedimentary rocks of the Phanerozoic Carnarvon Basin. To the north, schist of the Gascoyne Complex probably pass with decreasing intensity of metamorphism into metamorphosed sedimentary rocks of the upper Wyloo Group.

The Gascoyne Complex is divided into two parts, the 1840–1620 Ma northern and central Gascoyne Complex, and the 2005–1970 Ma Glenburgh Terrane in the southern Gascoyne Complex. The two are separated by a major east-southeast trending fault, the Chalba Shear Zone. Rocks of the Glenburgh Terrane do not outcrop at surface north of the Chalba Shear Zone, but it is unclear as to whether or not rocks of this terrane floor all or part of the central and northern Gascoyne Complex.

The Gascoyne Complex has been shaped by four orogenies, the most important and widespread of which were the 1830–1780 Ma Capricorn Orogeny and the 1680–1620 Ma Mangaroon Orogeny. Both of these orogenies were marked by extensive folding, faulting and metamorphism, and were accompanied by the intrusion of large volumes of granite referred to as supersuites. The effects of the oldest orogeny, the 2005–1960 Ma Glenburgh Orogeny, although known only from the southern end of the complex, reflect a period of substantial granite magmatism and intense deformation and metamorphism. The Neoproterozoic Edmundian Orogeny mainly consists of the reactivation of earlier formed faults in the Gascoyne Complex, along with folding and faulting of the overlying Edmund and Collier basins.

== Glenburgh terrane ==
In this section the component rock units of the Gascoyne Complex, and the orogenies that shaped the complex, are discussed in order of decreasing age.

=== Halfway Gneiss ===
This rock unit is exposed only in the Glenburgh terrane at the southern end of the Gascoyne Complex. The gneiss is a composite of c. 2540 Ma granites and c. 2000 Ma granites that were together deformed and metamorphosed during the Glenburgh Orogeny. Although the c. 2540 Ma granites are Archean in age, they are younger than any known granites from the Yilgarn craton to the south. The c. 2000 Ma component of the Halfway Gneiss overlaps with the age of the Dalgaringa supersuite (2005–1960 Ma), and probably represents an intensely deformed portion of the supersuite.

=== Moogie metamorphics ===
The Moogie metamorphics consist of schist and gneiss, which represent deformed and metamorphosed sandstone, siltstone and shale, and carbonate rocks. This rock unit is known only from the Glenburgh terrane. These rocks were first deformed during the 2005–1960 Ma Glenburgh Orogeny, when they were also intruded by granites of the Dalgaringa supersuite.

=== Dalgaringa supersuite ===
The Dalgaringa supersuite comprises sheets, dykes and veins of 2005–1985 Ma foliated and gneissic tonalite, granodiorite, quartz diorite and monzogranite, intruded by a large pluton of c. 1975 Ma mesocratic and leucocratic tonalite. The oldest, and possibly most abundant, rock type is a mesocratic, foliated to gneissic diorite to tonalite, which is typically pegmatite banded. At any given locality this rock type is intruded by several granite phases, typically in the following order: foliated biotite monzogranite and leucocratic tonalite, then biotite granodiorite and monzogranite and, finally, biotite monzogranite, syenogranite and pegmatite.

== Central and northern Gascoyne Complex ==
=== Morrissey metamorphics ===
The Morrissey metamorphics are a group of metamorphic rocks dominated by pelitic and psammitic schists derived from the metamorphism of shales and sandstones. This unit also includes some metamorphosed mafic igneous rocks and carbonate rocks. The sedimentary precursors to the Morrissey Metamorphics were deposited after about 1840 Ma, and were deformed and metamorphosed at amphibolite facies during the 1830–1780 Ma Capricorn Orogeny, before being intruded by granites of the Moorarie supersuite at 1810–1780 Ma.

=== Pooranoo metamorphics ===
The Pooranoo metamorphics are a sequence of biotite-muscovite-quartz-plagioclase+/-sillimanite schists and gneisses with an interpreted psammitic and pelitic (sedimentary) protolith. They have attained a peak of amphibolite facies, within the sillimanite grade.

The Pooranoo metamorphics were deposited at the end of the Capricorn Orogeny. The maximum depositional age of the Pooranoo Metamorphics is constrained by detrital zircon dates of 1680 +/- 14 Ma derived from arenaceous metasediments.

The Pooranoo metamorphics are intruded by granites of the Durlacher supersuite, which has been dated at 1680 Ma.

The metamorphic grade of the Pooranoo metamorphics varies, with two belts of different metamorphic character and timing during the Mangaroon orogeny recognised. These are divided by the Ti Tree Creek Lineament, a multiply reactivated fault which bisects the Gascoyne Complex.

North of the Ti Tree Creek Lineament the Pooranoo metamorphics and Durlacher granites endured Abukuma Facies Series low-pressure, high-temperature sillimanite grade metamorphism, with a date of 1680-1675 Ma returned from zircons
South of the Ti Tree Lineament, the Pooranoo metamorphics and Durlacher granites endured a high-pressure, high-temperature Barrovian Facies Series metamorphic event, typically reaching garnet grade. This occurred at 1665 - 1650 Ma.

== Granitic intrusive suites ==
=== Moorarie supersuite ===
The Moorarie supersuite consists of voluminous granites intruded across the Gascoyne Complex at c. 1830–1780 Ma and are syntectonic with the Capricorn Orogeny. The granites are predominantly biotite granites. The Moorarie supersuite includes granites of the Minne Creek batholith which include a molybdenum-tungsten mineralised leucocratic granite porphyry.

=== Durlacher supersuite ===
The Durlacher supersuite is a granite suite which was intruded into the Gascoyne Complex during the Mangaroon Orogeny. It is composed of two suites of granites

- A northern belt of S-type (two-mica) granites (the Minnie Creek suite)
- A southern belt of S-type and I-type granites

Most intrusions of this age are heavily sheared orthoclase porphyroclastic granites. Geochronology on the granites is sparse, but has constrained the intrusions to 1680 to 1620 Ma, which is syntectonic to post-tectonic with the Mangaroon Orogeny.

== Peripheral units ==
Several fold and thrust belts and sedimentary basins are peripheral, and potentially related, to the Gascoyne Complex.

Between approximately 2000-1800 Ma, on the northern margin of the Yilgarn craton, the c. 1890 Ma Narracoota Volcanics of the Bryah Basin formed in a transverse back-arc rift sag basin during collision. Culmination of the cratonic collision resulted in the foreland sedimentary Padbury Basin. To the east the Yerrida and Earaheedy Basins were passive margins along the Yilgarn's northern margin. The c. 1830 Ma phase of the Capricorn Orogeny resulted in northeast-southwest deformation of the Bryah-Padbury Basin with flood basalts in the Yerrida Basin.

The Gascoyne Complex rocks, namely the Yarlarweelor Gneiss are thrusted eastward onto the upper rock units of the Bryah Basin and the whole succession of the Padbury Basin. The Yerrida Basin was affected by this east-west compression adjacent to the Goodin Fault. This event is incongruous with the c. 1830 Ma Capricorn Orogeny, is strike-slip to oblique-slip in nature and is most likely the Mangaroon Orogeny.

== See also ==
- Geology of Australia
