= Geology of Guyana =

Guyana occurs within the northern part of the Guiana Shield. The Guiana Shield forms the northern part of the Amazonian Craton, the core of the South American continent.

Most of the geology of northern Guyana consists of Palaeoproterozoic Orosirian greenstone belts (Barama-Mazaruni Supergroup) intruded by granites. These are overlain unconformably by the Statherian Burro-Burro Group, which consist of the Muruwa Formation sandstones and Iwokrama Formation felsic volcanics. Both are intruded by granites associated with the Iwokrama Formation. Some folding occurred before these were overlain by the locally unconformable almost flat lying Roraima Group.

Major mafic sills and dykes of the Avanavero Suite intrude all of the older rocks, and are part of a Large Igneous Province (LIP). Numerous mafic dykes intruded the basement in the late Permian and Early Jurassic, associated with the start of the separation of Africa from South America. These are part of the Central Atlantic Magmatic Province (CAMP).

The northern Guiana Shield, including Guyana is separated from Southern Guiana Shield by ENE to NE trending Tumbes /Guayaquil - Tacutu Tectonic Lineament. This is a major regional pre-Cambrian shear zone / mega-shear which is believed to have been re-activated several times. At the beginning of the Mesozoic when Africa and South America started to separate, this re-activated again and was involved in formation of the Takutu Graben in the lower Rupununi area, and deposition of the Takutu Formation. One locality with a possible dinosaur or bird footprint is known near Lethem; List of fossiliferous stratigraphic units in Guyana.

Later the separation of Africa and South America also resulted in sedimentation in the Guyana-Suriname basin near the coast and offshore. Both the onshore Takutu sedimentary basin and the offshore Guiana Basin have oil potential, and in 2015 significant oil was found in a deep water area off Guyana associated with the NW-SE trend of canyon sediments associated with the palaeo-Berbice River. During the Mesozoic the headwaters of the Upper Orinoco and Rio Branco flowed through the Takutu Graben via the Essequibo either to the current river mouth, to the Corentyne, the Berbice or the Canje Rivers. Tilting associated with rifting of the Atlantic Ocean resulted in complex patterns of river capture, so now the headwaters of the Rio Branco flow to the south via the Amazon, and the headwaters of the Upper Orinoco flow to the west and north. Water and sediment volumes directly flowing east are now much reduced.
