= Ketilidian orogeny =

Late Paleoproterozoic mountain-building event

The Ketilidian orogeny was a late Paleoproterozoic mountain-building event that affected southern Greenland during the period 1.85 to 1.72 Ga. The orogenic belt formed during this event, sometimes known as the Ketilidian mobile belt, forms the southern boundary to the mainly Archaean North Atlantic Craton. The belt is 250–350 km wide, much of it covered by ice. It is correlated with the Makkovik Province in Labrador, Canada, which has a similar history.
