= Yilgarn Craton =

Large craton in Western Australia

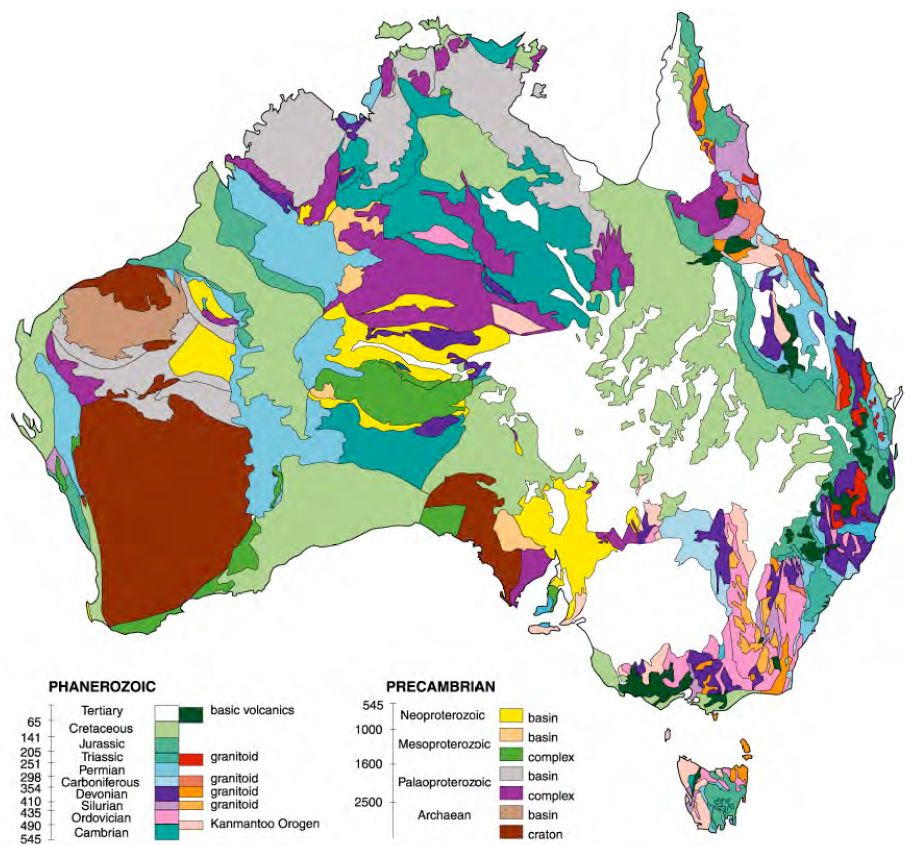
Basic geological regions of Australia, by age. The large brown region in the lower left of the continent constitutes the Yilgarn Craton.

The Yilgarn Craton is a large craton that constitutes a major part of the Western Australian land mass. It is bounded by a mixture of sedimentary basins and Proterozoic fold and thrust belts. Zircon grains in the Jack Hills, Narryer terrane have been dated at ~4.27 Ga.

The Murchison Province of the craton contains the over 2 billion year old Yarrabubba impact structure, previously regarded as the oldest dated meteorite impact crater, until the discovery of evidence such as shatter cones confirming the existence of the 3.47 billion year old North Pole Crater near Marble Bar in the Pilbara.

== Geology ==
The Yilgarn Craton appears to have been assembled between ~2.94 and 2.63 Ga by the accretion of a multitude of formerly present blocks or terranes of existing continental crust, most of which formed between 3.2 Ga and 2.8 Ga.

This accretion event is recorded by widespread granite and granodiorite intrusions, which comprise over 70% of the Yilgarn craton; voluminous tholeiitic basalt and komatiite volcanism; regional metamorphism and deformation as well as the emplacement of the vast majority of the craton's endowment in gold mineralisation.

These accretion events occurred in several phases, probably by accretion of continental fragments separated by pauses in subduction, with renewed activity occurring episodically.

The craton is primarily composed of approximately 2.8 billion year old (~2.8 Ga) rocks, including metamorphic terrain from the Western Gneiss Belt, the Southern Cross and the greenschist metamorphic Murchison Provinces). Some greenstone belts and granites are as old as 3.1-2.9 Ga, and some are younger, at ~2.75-2.65 Ga.

The craton is one of the distinct physiographic provinces of the West Australian Shield physiographic division, which comprises the Stirling-Mount Barren Block, Darling Hills, and Recherche Shelf sections.

== Western Gneiss terrane ==
The Western Gneiss terrane is a series of polydeformed high-grade early Archaean metamorphic belts, composed predominantly of feldspathic leucocratic granulite gneisses, which represent some of the oldest crustal fragments on Earth. The Western Gneiss terrane is distinct from the remainder of the Yilgarn Craton in that the latter has a predominance of metavolcanic rocks, both felsic and mafic, whereas the former consists of high-grade metasediments and gneisses of unknown protolith.

The Western Gneiss terrane is exposed along the western half of the northern margin of the Yilgarn Craton as the Narryer Gneiss terrane, a composite of heavily polydeformed feldspathic metagranite and metasedimentary amphibolite-grade gneisses and migmatites, dated at greater than 3.3 Ga and up to 3.8 Ga in age, flanked by the Murgoo Gneiss terrane (2.95 Ga), as well as sheets of 2.75 Ga to 2.6 Ga granite, obducted ophiolite sheets (the Trillbar Complex) and some 2.4 Ga to 2.0 Ga Proterozoic gneiss belts.

On the western edge of the Yilgarn Craton, partially covered by Phanerozoic sedimentary basins and in faulted contact with the 2.7 Ga to 2.55 Ga Yilgarn tectonic domains, lies the Jimperding Gneiss Complex of 2.75 to 2.65 Ga age, composed primarily of micaceous quartzite, quartz-feldspar-biotite-garnet gneiss, andalusite and sillimanite schists, banded iron formation and other exotics, intruded by minor masses of porphyritic granite.

Detrital zircons in the Jimperding Gneiss Complex range in age from 3267 ± 30 Ma to 3341 ± 100 Ma, with metamorphic overgrowth dated at 3180 Ma.

On the southwest of the Yilgarn Craton the Balingup Gneiss Complex is situated inboard from the Early Proterozoic Leeuwin Complex of metamorphic rocks. The Balingup Complex consists primarily of metasedimentary paragneiss, granite orthogneiss, with minor layers of calc-silicate, ultramafic and ortho-amphibolite gneiss. The metamorphic grade is considered to be peak granulite facies, but the majority has preserved peak amphibolite facies assemblages.

In total, the Western Gneiss terrane sub-blocks represent an earlier substrate upon which the majority of the Yilgarn Craton's about 2.70 to 2.55 Ga greenstone metavolcanic belts have been deposited and into which the voluminous Archaean trondhjemite-tonalite-granodiorite suite and trondhjemite-tonalite-diorite suite granites were emplaced.

== Murchison Province ==
The Murchison Province is exposed in the western and northern third of the Yilgarn Craton. The Province is bounded by major transcrustal structures which separate it from the surrounding tectonic provinces of the craton and the Western Gneiss Belt.

The Murchison Province Stratigraphy, after Watkins (1990), is divided into six basic structural-stratigraphic components - two greenstone belt metavolcanic-metasedimentary sequences and four suites of granitoids.

- Luke Creek Group metavolcanics
- Mount Farmer Group
- Early granodiorite-monzogranite intrusive suite (now pegmatite-banded orthogneiss)
- Monzogranite Suite (now folded, metagranite)
- Two post-tectonic differentiated suites of granitoid rocks

The Murchison Province contains the Yarrabubba crater, which is the oldest dated meteorite impact crater, at 2229 ± 5 Ma. The crater is heavily eroded and no surface expression remains of the original structure. The primary trace is an elliptical aero-magnetic anomaly, measuring approximately 20 km by 11 km, as well as the presence of shock-recrystallised minerals. This impact may have ended the Huronian glaciation by climate forcing with a significant pulse of greenhouse gases, as the age broadly overlaps with the youngest glacial deposits.

== Southern Cross province ==
The Southern Cross province lies in the Yilgarn craton. The Marda–Diemals greenstone belt in the Southern Cross terrane has three layers: the greenstone belt, a felsic layer, and a sedimentary layer.

== Eastern Goldfield province ==
The Archaean Norseman-Wiluna Greenstone Belt in the Eastern Goldfield province contains Australia's lode gold deposits, including the Kalgoorlie Golden Mile. Much of the gold was deposited between 2650–2630 Ma, with much of this associated with strike-slip reactivation of earlier faults (normal and reverse).

An earlier gold event 2660-2655 Ma was associated with major extension (normal faulting and granite doming) resulting in the formation of late basins and the intrusion of mantle-derived magmas (syenites and Mafic-type granites/porphyries) and tight anticlockwise PTt paths.

== Bounding terranes ==
The Yilgarn Craton is bound on all sides by younger terranes of various ages, but predominantly of Proterozoic age. The boundaries between the various flanking terranes provide considerable evidence of the post-Archaean events which have involved the Yilgarn Craton.

=== Perth Basin ===
The Yilgarn Craton is bound on the western side by the Perth Basin, of Jurassic age, and is separated from this basin by the Darling Fault. The Perth Basin is considered to be a rift fill basin formed on a passive margin.

=== Gascoyne Complex ===
The Perth Basin is bound on the north by the Gascoyne Complex, Glengarry Basin and Yerrida Basin, which are all part of a middle Proterozoic mobile belt which leads east to the Musgrave Block. The Gascoyne complex and other metamorphic belts of this age including reactivation of the Yarlarweelor Gneiss and Narryer Gneiss terrane, indicate prolonged multi-phased strike-slip movement (relative to the Yilgarn Craton margin) from the late Archaean through to neoproterozoic and even into the Palaeozoic.

=== Albany-Fraser Orogen ===
The Yilgarn Craton is bounded on the east-southeast by the ~1,300 Ma Albany-Fraser Orogen, composed primarily of amphibolite to greenschist facies sedimentary protolith gneisses, migmatites and granites. The Albany-Fraser Orogen displays both subduction-related and prolonged strike-slip tectonic structures and is intimately interconnected with the other Proterozoic basins and mobile belts of Australia.

== Sedimentary basin cover ==
The Yilgarn Craton is partially covered by onlapping sedimentary basins of Palaeozoic and Phanerozoic age in the east and north-east, including the Canning Basin. It is bounded on the western edge by the Darling Scarp and Darling Fault which separate the Yilgarn Craton from the Perth Basin to the west, and is covered by several remnant sedimentary basins of Jurassic age such as the Collie Sub-Basin.

The Yilgarn Craton also has a considerable Tertiary and younger sedimentary veneer of palaeochannel deposits derived from prolonged erosion, sedimentation and redeposition of older cover sequences and regolith as well as the Archaean basement itself.

Recognised Tertiary cover sequences include the Bremer Basin, Officer Basin and others.

== Regolith ==
The Yilgarn craton is believed to have remained at or above sea level for a considerable length of time. Some of the Yilgarn regolith is the oldest in the world, recording weathering events as early as the Cretaceous Period. This has been created by the generally subtropical latitudes and conditions of the Yilgarn craton, with minimal to no glaciation and generally flat topographical relief resulting in comparatively minor erosion.

The regolith is extremely deeply weathered, in some areas completely converted to saprolite up to 100 metres below surface. This is considered to have been produced during Caenozoic to Palaeocene tropical conditions, as evidenced by mottled duricrust which records fossilised tree roots, some over 60 million years old. Previous weathering events have been recorded in magnetically remnant ferruginous laterite of a Jurassic age, at about 180 Ma.

The regolith of the Yilgarn impacts directly on the flora and fauna, as some of the soil is essentially fossilised. Much of the groundwater of the Yilgarn is hypersaline, with some being supersaturated in salt. This renders swathes of land barren, with significant salt lakes, and high saline water tables. The origin of this salt is thought to be from precipitation of sea salt carried over the Australian landmass for the past several dozen million years, and the high evaporation rate leaving the salt behind.

The greenstone belts of the Yilgarn Craton include:

- Southern Cross Greenstone Belt
- Norseman-Wiluna Belt
- Duketon Belt
- Gullewa Greenstone Belt

== Economic geology ==
The Yilgarn Craton is Australia's premier mineral province. It attracts more than half of Australia's minerals exploration expenditure, and produces two thirds of all gold and most of the nickel mined in Australia. The craton contains some 30% of the world's known gold reserves, about 20% of the world's nickel reserves, 80% of the world's tantalum reserves, considerable iron ore, copper, zinc and minor lead reserves. The craton contains significant platinum, vanadium, hard-rock titanium and considerable iron ore resources.

Mining is conducted mostly in the greenstone belts around mining centres such as Kalgoorlie, Kambalda, Norseman, Meekatharra and Wiluna, and minor centres such as Laverton, Leinster, Leonora and Southern Cross.

Ore concentrates or finished product are transported by rail or road to Perth, Fremantle, Esperance, Albany or Geraldton.

=== Iron ore ===
Iron ore is currently recovered from several areas in the Yilgarn Craton, although it is a much smaller set of mines than those in the Pilbara Craton. Iron ore is mined at Koolyanobbing, north of Kalgoorlie from hematite weathered banded iron formation, at Mount Gibson, Weld Range and Jack Hills in the Western Gneiss terrane from hematite banded iron formation to produce direct-shipping ore.

The Karara Iron Ore Project is the only operational magnetite mine in the Yilgarn Craton, however, other magnetite iron ore deposits are being investigated as a source of magnetite ore in the Albany-Fraser Complex, where a large deposit is being proposed at Southdown. The Jack Hills, Weld Range and Mount Gibson banded iron formations, as well as banded iron formations around Yalgoo, are also considered potential sources of magnetite iron ore, although no operations are as yet running on this type of ore.

Further away from the coast, deposits of banded iron formation at Wiluna and Laverton are also under investigation, although infrastructure is considered too poor to render these deposits economic.

=== Gold ===
The Yilgarn Craton is host to around 4% of the world's economically demonstrably recoverable reserves (EDR) of gold.

A key feature beneath many of the region's gold deposits are granite-cored domes at a range of scales. These provided an architecture that focussed fluid metals into the upper crust's depositional sites.

Signatures of the mantle are found in many large deposits, including melts from metasomatised mantle wedge as well as lamprophyres. Debate continues whether these mantle rocks were a fluid and/or metal source, or simply reflect a favourable pathway.

=== Nickel-PGE deposits ===
Kambalda type komatiitic nickel ore deposits are the primary source of nickel metal within the Yilgarn Craton.

=== Base metals ===
Copper, lead and zinc are currently mined from Golden Grove and the newly developed Jaguar zinc mine. Minor amounts of copper have been recovered from several copper-bearing gold deposits such as those in the Gullewa Greenstone Belt, at Burtville south of Laverton, at Granny Smith and elsewhere.

Exploration for copper is continuing in several areas around Ravensthorpe, Balagundi, in the Yandall Belt, and the Duketon Belt, where large felsic volcanic packages are known to exist.

=== Rare-earth elements ===
The Yilgarn Craton may host up to 60% of the world's recoverable rare-earth elements, primarily in the Mount Weld Carbonatite. Smaller carbonatite occurrences at Ponton, near Laverton, and regionally within the eastern granite-gneiss and greenstone belts, may also prove economic.

=== Uranium ===
The Yilgarn Craton and its cover sequences are host to a significant percentage of the world's endowment in economically demonstrable and recoverable reserves (EDR) of uranium. Most uranium is hosted within palaeochannels derived from granites of the Yilgarn Craton and/or its flanking Proterozoic orogens, and this metal is deposited within Tertiary or younger palaeodrainage and current drainage systems. Examples include Yeelirrie, Mulga Rock and Lake Way-Centipede.

=== Partial list of ore deposits and mines ===
World-class deposits in the Yilgarn Craton include:

- Mount Charlotte,
- Cosmos Nickel Projects, Cosmos Pit, Cosmos Deeps, Alec Mairs and Tapinos high-grade massive sulphides.
- Kambalda nickel mines, Kambalda Dome and Widgiemooltha
- Miitel, Mariners, Redross and Wannaway nickel mines, Widgiemooltha Dome
- Emily Ann and Maggie Hays nickel mines, Lake Johnston Greenstone Belt
- Golden Grove Mine Cu-Zn-Au mine
- Windimurra vanadium resource, Windimurra Intrusion, Mount Magnet
- Greenbushes Lithium mine
- Mt Cattlin Lithium-Tantalum mine
- Bald Hill Lithium and Tantalum Mine

== See also ==
- Archaean – Geologic eon, 4031–2500 million years ago
- Australian Shield – Large part of the continent of Australia
- Centralian Superbasin – Sedimentary basin in Australia
- Gawler Craton – Province of the larger West Australian Shield in central South Australia
- Geology of Australia
- Ore genesis – How the various types of mineral deposits form within the Earth's crust
- Perth Basin – Sedimentary basin in Western Australia
- Pilbara Craton – Geologic formation in Western Australia
- Western Plateau – Australian drainage region
