= Gawler Craton =

Province of the larger West Australian Shield in central South Australia

The Gawler Craton covers approximately 440,000 square kilometres of central South Australia. Its Precambrian crystalline basement crustal block was cratonised ca. 1550–1450 Ma. Prior to 1550 Ma the craton comprised a number of active Proterozoic orogenic belts extending back in time to at least 2450 Ma.

The Craton can be subdivided into a number of tectonic subdomains on the basis of structure and tectonostratigraphic history. The south-central Eyre Peninsula straddles the boundary between the Archaean to early Palaeoproterozoic Coulta Subdomain and the Cleve Subdomain, a Palaeoproterozoic orogenic belt ("mobile zone") probably representing a shelf or basinal depository for the Hutchison Group (ca. 1900–1845 Ma) prior to its deformation during the Kimban orogeny (ca. 1845–1710 Ma). On northeastern Eyre Peninsula, the Cleve Subdomain is bounded by the slightly younger Moonta Subdomain which is characterised by less intensely deformed metamorphosed acid volcanics and sediments ranging from the Myola Volcanics and Moonta Porphyry to the Moonabie Formation and Wandearah Metasiltstone.

Subsequent deformation on the craton has been largely epeirogenic forming shallow fault-bounded intracontinental depressions represented by Cainozoic basins, the southern continental margin and Spencer Gulf.

== Physiography ==
The Gawler Craton, or Gawler Block, is a distinct physiographic province of the larger West Australian Shield division. It includes the smaller Stuart Range Basin and Pimba Platform physiographic sections.

== Northwestern Fowler Domain ==
The Fowler Domain is a major tectonic zone on the north-western flank of the Gawler Craton comprising dense, magnetic, highly deformed, intermediate to ultramafic intrusives overlain by thin Tertiary sands and recent sand dunes. Aeromagnetic surveys show the presence of a high concentration of crustal scale fractures and faults in this area. These structures could have provided pathways for the intrusion of mafic-ultramafic bodies with potential for nickel sulfides, chromite and platinoids.

== Eastern Olympic Copper-Gold Province ==
The Olympic Copper-Gold Province is a 650 km long corridor along the eastern boundary of the craton.

== Eastern and Central, Gawler Ranges ==
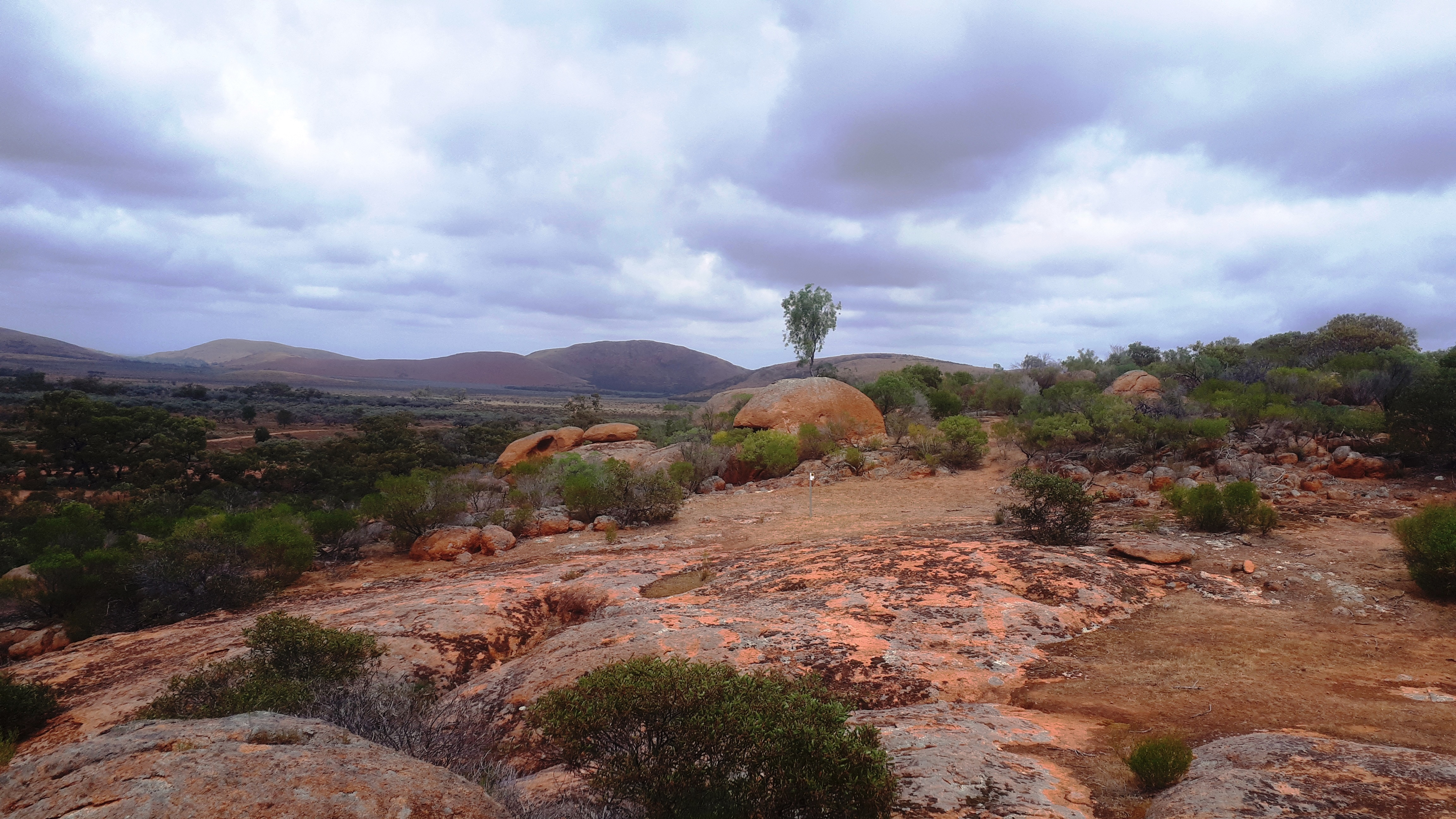
Pink granite in Hiltaba Nature Reserve

Palaeoproterozoic rocks of the eastern and central Gawler Craton are overlain by relatively unmetamorphosed clastics of the Corunna Conglomerate, the Gawler Range Volcanics (GRV), the Pandurra Formation, and thin platformal late Proterozoic and Cambrian sediments of the Stuart and Spencer Shelves. In and around the Gawler Ranges, the volcanics and older rocks were intruded by Hiltaba Suite granites (found in the Hiltaba Nature Reserve) which are closely associated with formation of the giant Olympic Dam ore body of the Eastern Olympic Copper-Gold Province. Although relatively undeformed, the Gawler Range Volcanics, which extend from the centre of the craton to its eastern margin, represent a major period of crustal deformation ca. 1590 Ma which heralded the final consolidation and stabilisation of the craton as it is seen today.

== Central Yarlbrinda Shear Zone ==
In the central Craton, the Yarlbrinda Shear Zone was likely formed by the Kararan Orogeny and it is host to several major gold prospects including those in the Nuckulla Hill region (Sheoak, Myall and Bimba) and at Tunkillia.

== Western Eyre Peninsula, Coulta Subdomain and Nuyts Subdomain ==
On western Eyre Peninsula, the Coulta Subdomain merges with the Nuyts Subdomain which is dominated by variably deformed ca. 1670–1610 Ma granitoids, mafics and felsic volcanics. Deformation is attributed to the Kalaran Orogeny which generated a major fold belt or shear zone, the Fowler Shear Zone, ca. 1600–1540 Ma.

== Economic geology ==
Economically important deposits found in the craton include gold, diamonds, copper, nickel, granite, iron ore, lead-zinc, uranium, coal, industrial minerals and arsenic.

The huge Olympic Dam copper-gold operation is located in the Eastern Olympic Copper-Gold Province at the cratons eastern edge. The Prominent Hill copper-gold mine is northwest of Olympic Dam and the Challenger Gold Mine is to the west of Prominent Hill located in the centre of the craton. The 70 million tonne Kalkaroo Mine is to the south and contains approximately 320,000 tonnes of copper, 1 million ounces of gold and 8.56 million kg of molybdenum in an optimised open pit designed to 230 metres depth.

The Wynbring area, a large part of the western Fowler Domain, covers approximately 2,000 square kilometres and consists of fractures that may include intrusion of mafic-ultramafic bodies with potential for nickel sulfides, chromite and platinoids. Exploration and regional drilling near the northern end of the Fowler Domain and within the Harris Greenstone Belt has identified numerous large mafic and ultramafic bodies which have the potential to host nickel sulfide mineralisation. Ultramafic intrusive rock hosting nickel bearing sulfides (pentlandite and mackinawite) have returned values up to 0.49% nickel, 38 parts per billion (ppb) platinum and 58 ppb palladium. Previous explorations reported up to 0.74% nickel from samples obtained in shallow bedrock drilling. The Thompson Belt in Canada has similar features and is considered by Primary Industries and Regions SA (PIRSA) as a possible analogue of the Fowler Domain. The Thompson Nickel Belt hosts major nickel deposits which have been mined by Inco since the early 1960s. Previous explorations in the Wynbring area consisted of wide-spaced reconnaissance bedrock drilling by PIRSA that indicated the presence of a 30 kilometre-long zone of intermediate to ultramafic rocks adjacent to a major fault and geochemically anomalous in gold, nickel, chromium, platinum and palladium.

Drilling has confirmed significant widespread uranium mineralisation at the "Warrior" palaeochannel in central Gawler just west of Prominent Hill and there is active uranium exploration over an extended portion of the Kingoonya Palaeochannel system within the southern Gawler Craton. "Warrior" is the most significant known uranium occurrence in the Gawler Craton.

== See also ==
- Acraman crater
- Archaean
- Australian Shield
- Centralian Superbasin
- Geology of Australia
- Narryer Gneiss terrane
- Ore genesis
- Perth Basin
- Pilbara craton
- Western Plateau
- Yilgarn Craton
