= Centralian Superbasin =

Sedimentary basin in Australia

The Centralian Superbasin is a large intracratonic sedimentary basin which occupied a large area of central, southern and western Australia during much of the Neoproterozoic Era (~830–540 Ma).

This intra-cratonic superbasin was disrupted by two periods of uplift and mountain building, Neoproterozoic Petermann Orogeny (by a central uplift and associated thrusts) and Palaeozoic Alice Springs Orogeny (by mid-Carboniferous tectonism), to leave remnants including the Amadeus, Georgina, Ngalia, and Officer basins.

== See also ==
- Natural history of Australia
