= Monuments of Australia =

Australia's monuments take on many distinct forms, including statues, fountains, natural landmarks and buildings. While some monuments of Australia hold a national significance, many are constructed and maintained by local community groups, and are primarily significant on a local scale. Although Australia's monuments have many roles, including as tourist attractions, their primary purpose is to "safeguard, prolong or preserve social memory into the future". This social memory may relate to anything from colonisation to local industry to sports. The monuments of Australia reflect the nation's social and political history and by memorialising select moments, contribute to shaping how Australian history is told. Although a significant portion of Australia is desert, the population is highly urbanised and the cities contain some noteworthy monuments.

== Pre-settlement monuments ==
=== Uluru ===
Uluru is a sandstone rock formation in the Northern Territory, with the closest large settlement being Alice Springs, 450 kilometres away. The formation is a protected world heritage site and is an important sacred site to the Indigenous Peoples of the area, the Pitjantjatjara. The site has been a large tourist attraction to the public since the 1930s, garnering over 250,000 visitors a year and the land and the surrounding area is also known for its large amounts of agriculture, harbouring exotic flora and fauna.

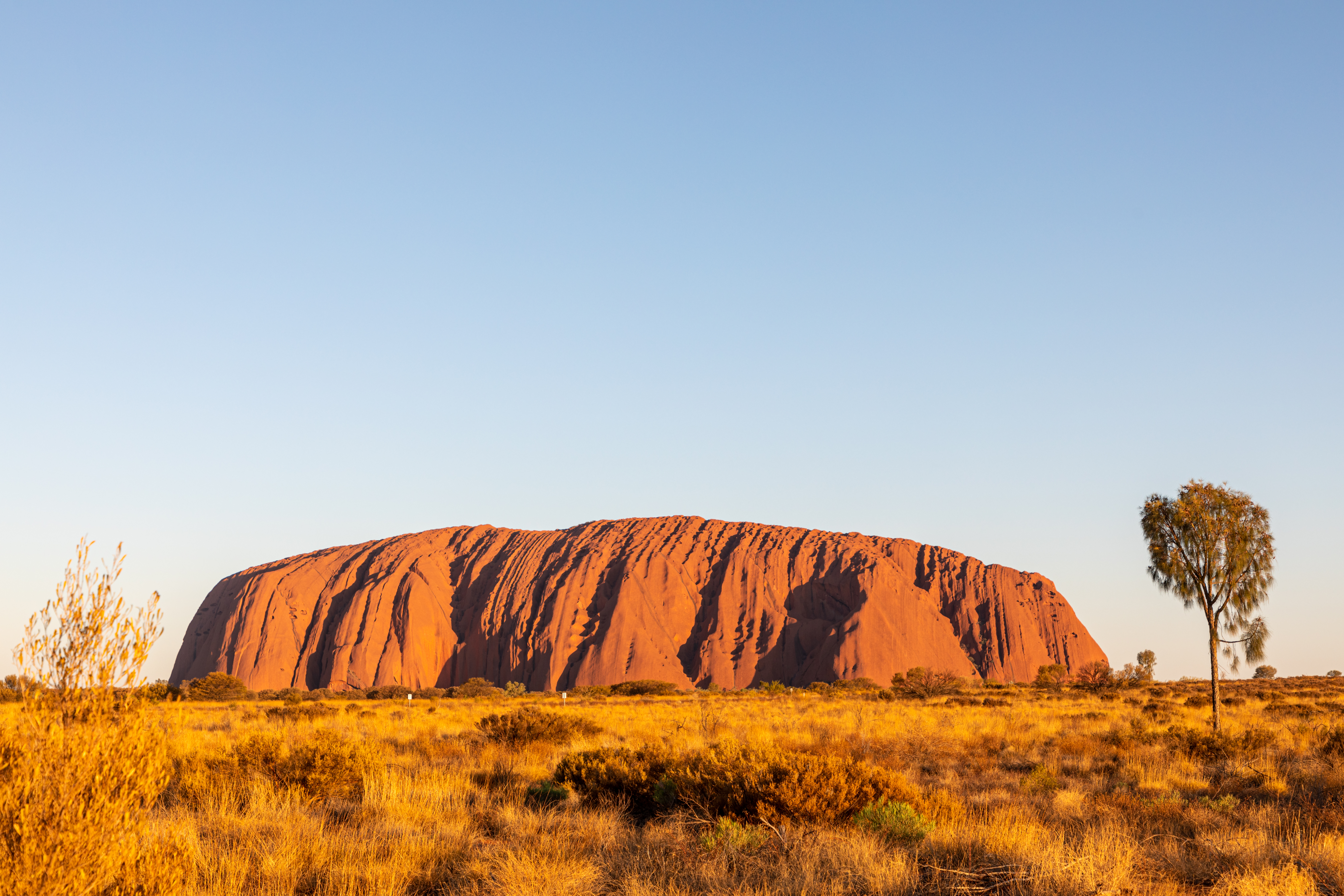
Uluru (Ayers Rock), NT, Australia

==== History ====
Uluru is estimated to have first started forming approximately 1.5 billion years ago, where rocks took place to form a protolith. Over the next billion years, it underwent various geological phenomena such as the Petermann and Alice Springs Orogenies that eventuated in the complete formation of the rock, approximately 300–400 million years ago.

==== Significance to the Aboriginal population ====
Uluru is also known as Ayers Rock, named by William Gosse, an Australian explorer, in honour of the governor of Australia in 1873, Sir Henry Ayers, when Goss became the first non-Aboriginal person to ever see Uluru. However, the name Uluru predates that of Ayers Rock by almost 10,000 years, given to it by the local indigenous population, the Pitjantjatjara people. According to the Aboriginal Australian creation tradition, known as the Dreaming, the featureless Earth took shape when the ancestors began to cause rocks to form through singing, along with other means of creating. The songs of creation are still sung by the Aboriginal people on Songlines, traditional journeys undertaken to maintain a connection to the land. The formations along Uluru's surface are believed by the Aboriginal to be physical manifestations of the events that occurred there, such as a depiction of a mouth silently screaming in anguish, and a scar that runs with water.

==== Today ====
Having been listed as a UNESCO World Heritage Site, Uluru is a major tourist destination, with over 300,000 tourists visiting every year. Until recently, it was legal for tourists to climb Uluru, but the law has since changed at the request of the Aboriginal elders.

Much infrastructure was built to accommodate for the climb; 138 steel posts were installed in the years of 1966 and 1976, along with a chain reaching a length of 450 metres that could bear a person weighing 125 kilograms holding onto the chain at a 45-degree angle. An octagonal cairn was also built at the top of Uluru, made of stones that were cemented together and painted to blend in with the colour of Uluru. To prevent further climbing that was in conflict with express wishes of the elders and thus maintain its cultural heritage, the board of the Uluru Kata Tjuta National Park decided to close the climb and remove the steel infrastructure from around Uluru. The board decided that the process of removing the climb infrastructure should not leave any visible evidence of the climbing posts on Uluru; that it should avoid or minimise any physical damage to Uluru in the process; that no part of the steel posts should remain exposed above the rock surface; and that the material used to fill the holes left by the posts should be durable and long lasting, and made to match the colour and texture of the existing surface of Uluru.

=== Great Barrier Reef ===
The Great Barrier Reef is a large expanse of coral reef lifeforms and animals located off the coast of Cairns, Queensland, Australia. It is the largest known reef system in the world, spreading over 344,400 square kilometres, being visible from space. It is one of the seven wonders of the world and is listed as a world heritage site as of 1981. It has considerable importance to local Aboriginal and Torres Strait Islander people, holding cultural significance that dates back 40,000 years.

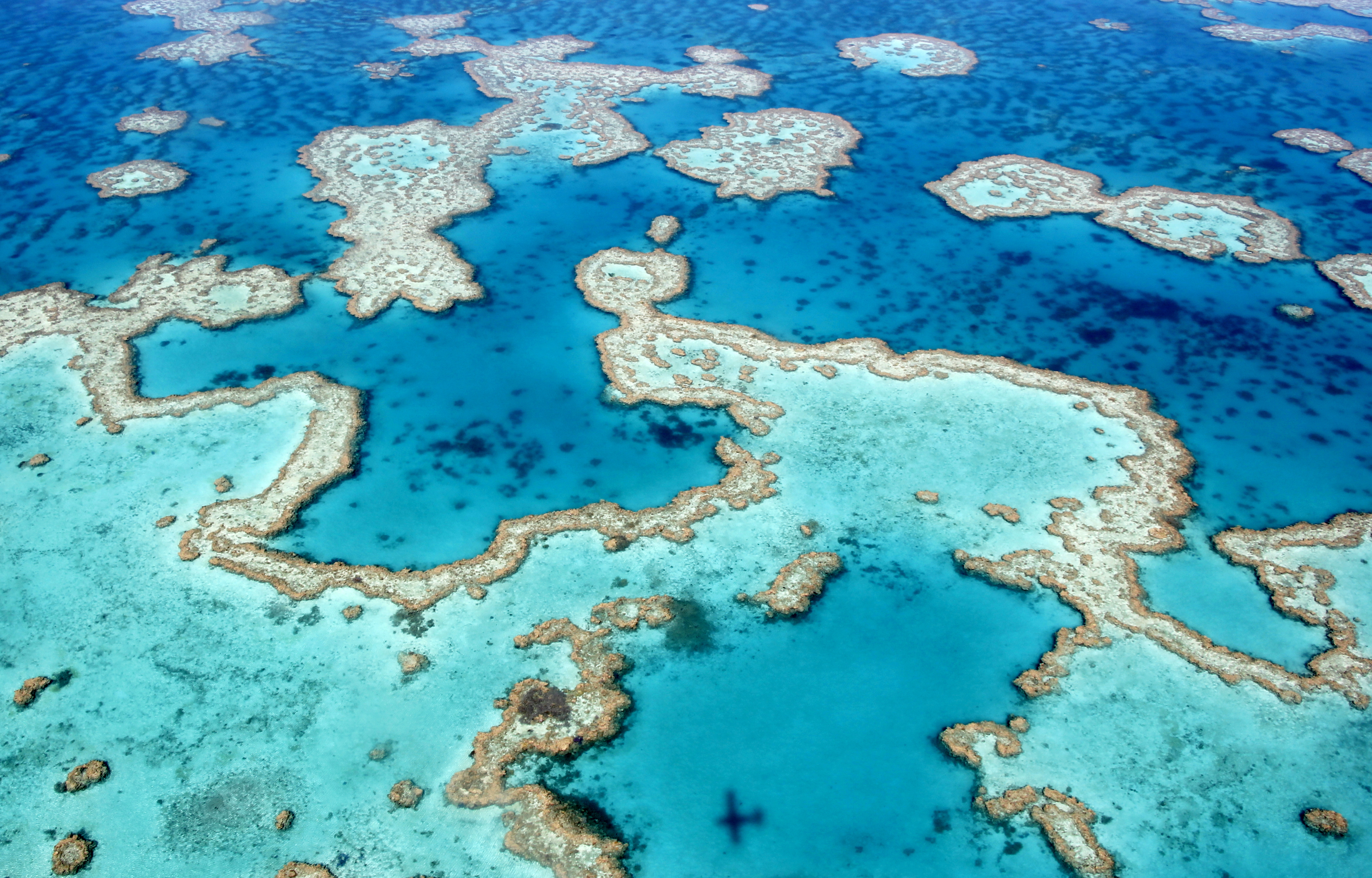
Great Barrier Reef, Cairns, Queensland, Australia

=== Blue Mountains ===
The Blue Mountains is a series of Mountains situated on the Western border of Greater Sydney, NSW. The range is a smaller part of a much larger series of mountains known as the Great Dividing Range, which defines a large part of the Eastern Coast of Australia. The Blue mountains have been significant in Aboriginal History, with two main peoples being located within the region, the Gundungurra people in the northern part and the Darug people in the southern. It was listed as a world heritage area in 2000, with roughly 10,000 square miles being listed.

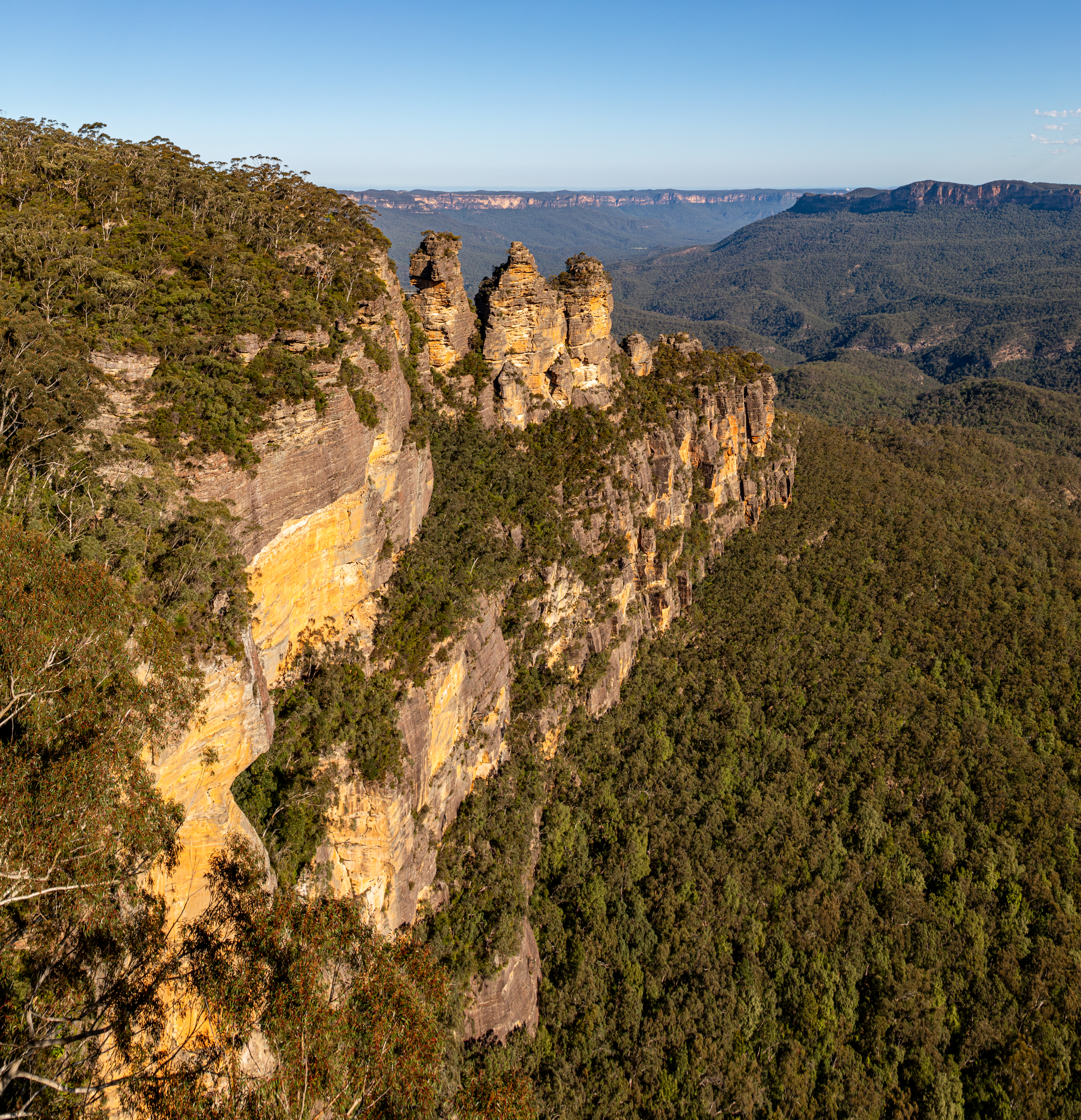
Three Sisters, Blue Mountains, Sydney, NSW, Australia

=== Daintree Rainforest ===
The Daintree Rainforest is in Queensland, and is the largest rainforest within Australia, spanning roughly 12,000 square kilometres. The rainforest was placed on the world heritage list in 1998, and hosts more than 400,000 visitors a year, serving as one of the largest tourist attractions in the Northern part of Australia. The rainforest dates back nearly 180,000 Millions years making it one of the oldest rainforests in the world, and it holds a variety of important plant, animal life and ecosystems unique to Australia.

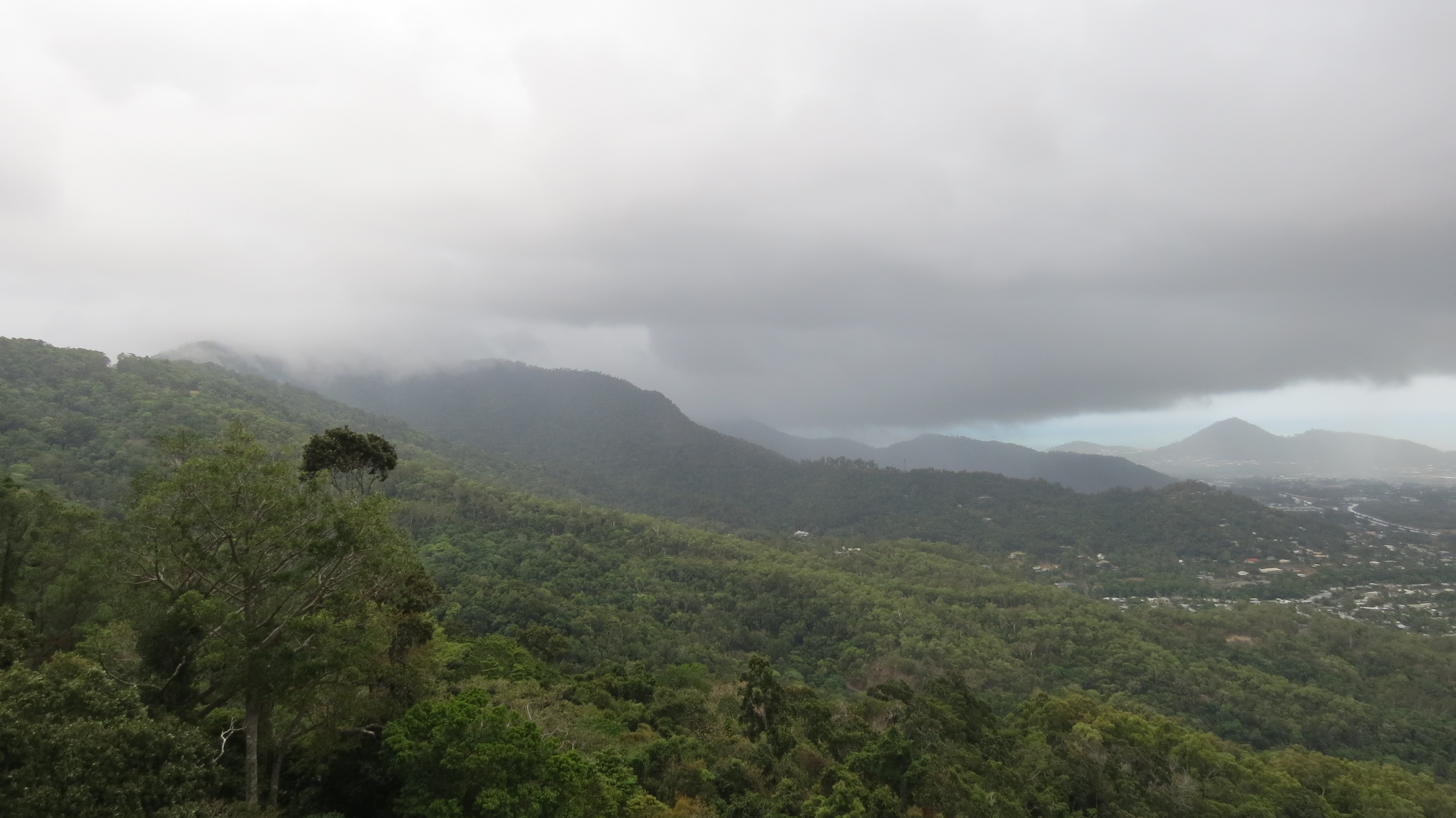
Daintree Rainforest, Queensland, Australia

=== Bondi Beach ===
Bondi Beach is a popular tourist attraction spanning 1 km of Eastern Sydney. The location is an important part of Australian culture, holding significance in sport (such as the city to surf race) as well as entertainment (such as Bondi Rescue). The area was originally occupied by local Aboriginal and Torres Strait Islander people, demonstrated through the recordings of rock carvings and paintings, but today serves as one of the largest tourist attractions in the country, with over 2.7 million people visiting in 2016.

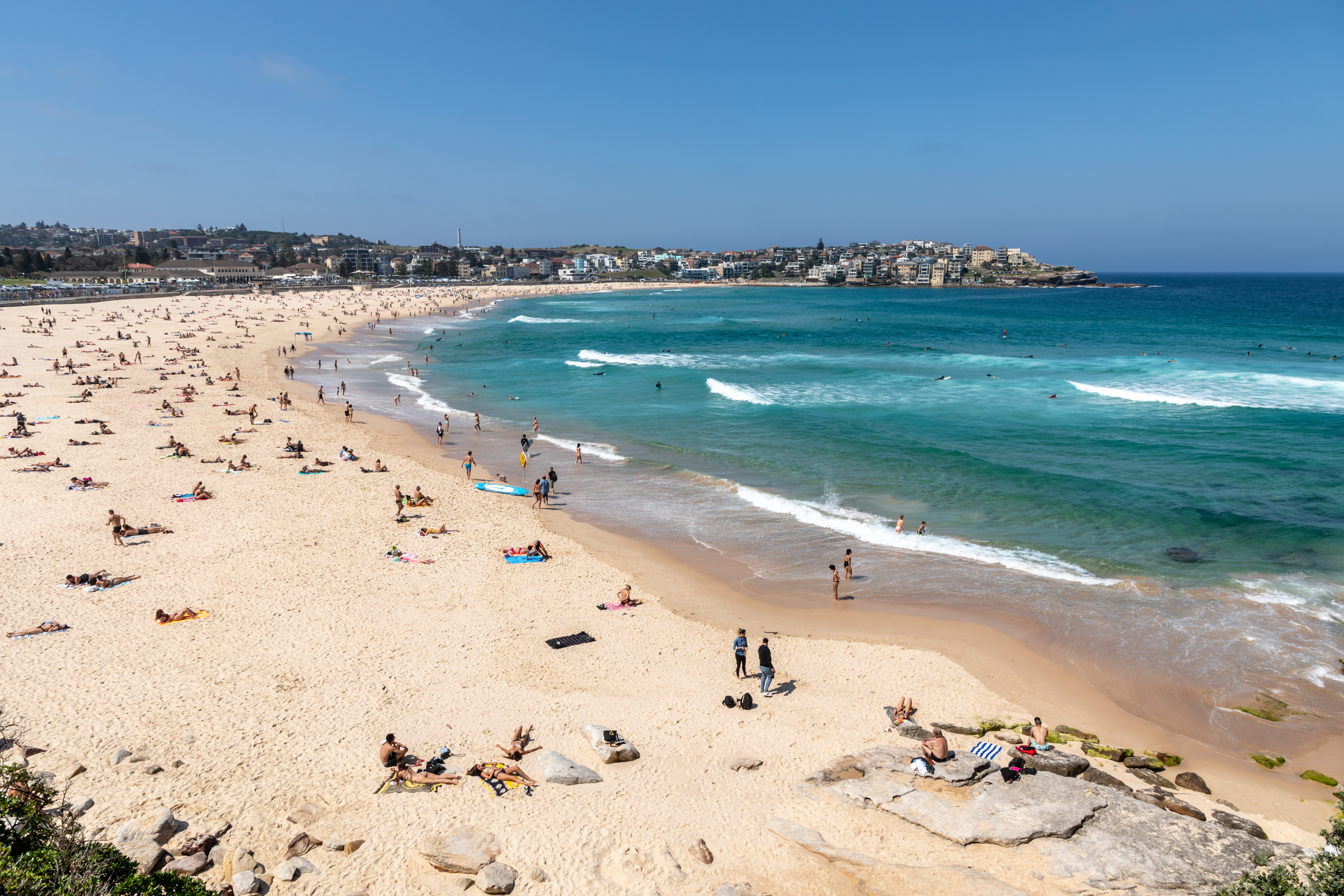
Bondi Beach, Sydney, NSW, Australia

=== Kakadu National Park ===
The Kakadu National Park is in the Northern Territory, covering nearly 20,000 square kilometres of land. The land holds significant flora and fauna, holding nearly 2000 species of flora, and thousands of different species of fauna within the area. It is also important due to the local indigenous population, whose culture is heavily invested in the natural features of the park believed to have been living in the area for over nearly 40,000 years, which can be viewed through the abundance of rock art in the national park. Furthermore, the area is heavily involved in the exploration and discovery of the country, as well as in the mineral industry of Australia.

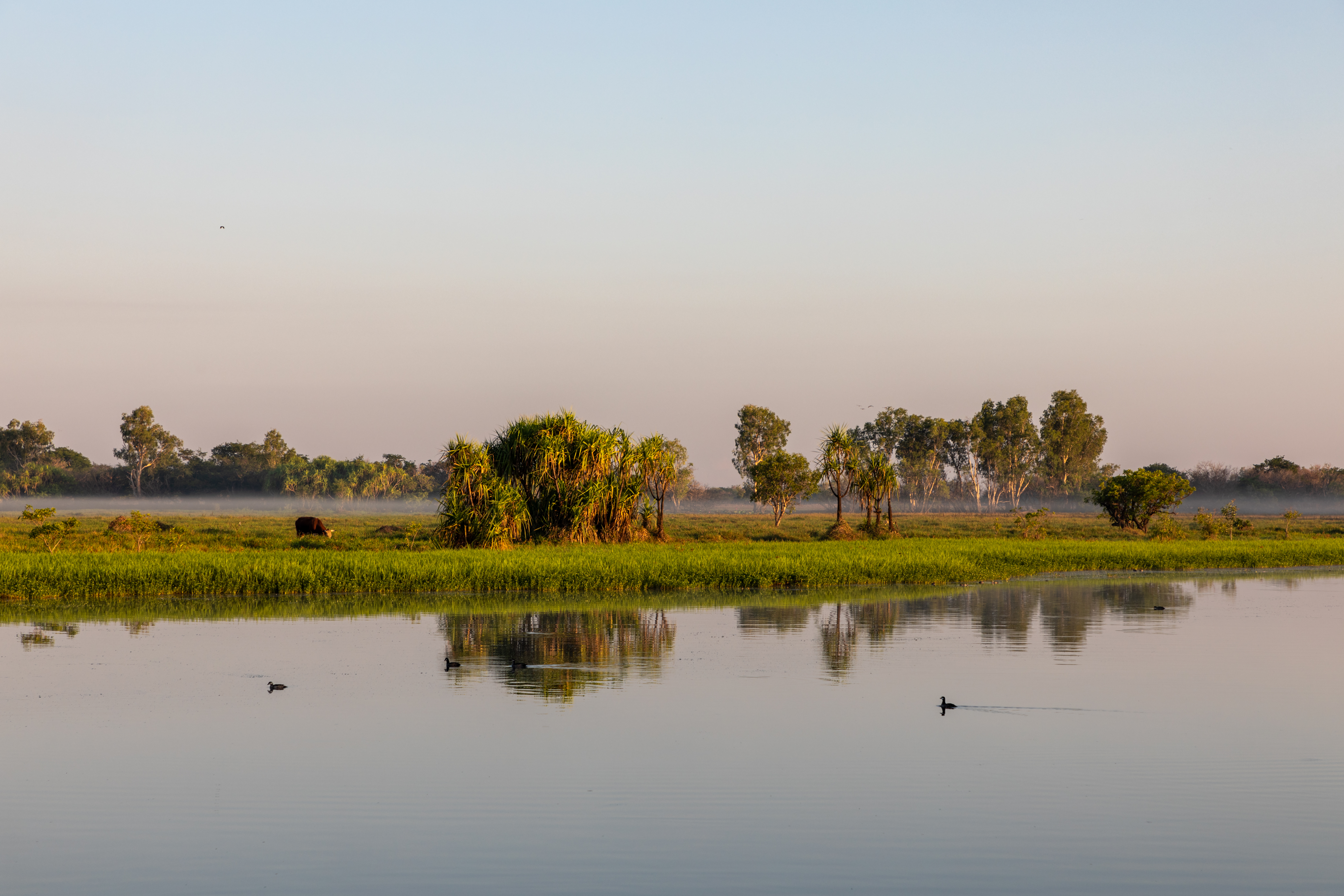
Kakadu National Park, Northern Territory, Australia

== Post-settlement monuments ==
=== Queen Victoria Building ===
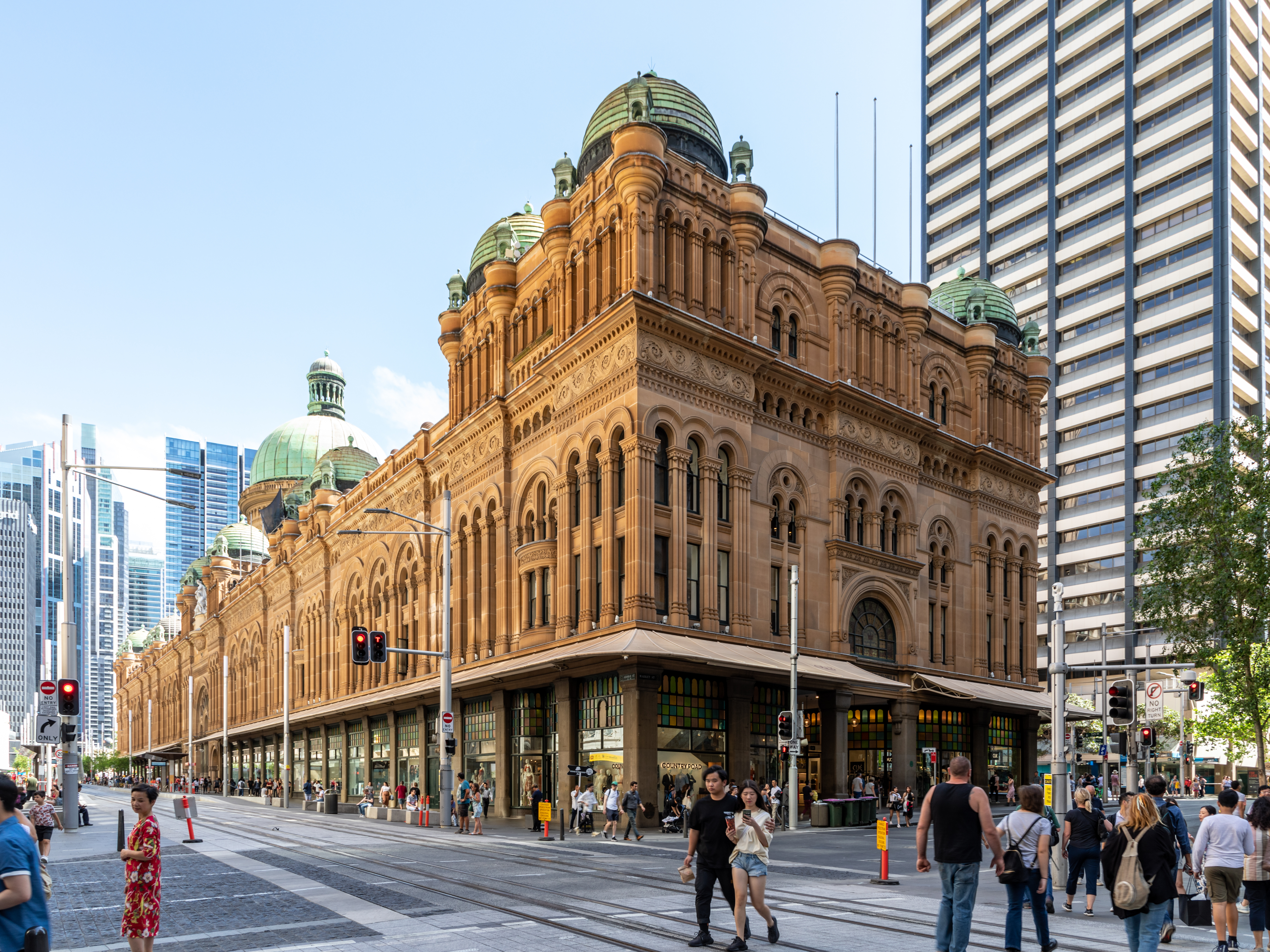
Queen Victoria Building, NSW, Australia

The Queen Victoria Building (QVB) is a Federation Romanesque style building built in the late 19th century. Located in Sydney's central business district, it is mainly a shopping centre.

==== History ====
The Queen Victoria Building was designed by architect George McRae in 1888, in response to a move to demolish the markets that were previously in George Street. McRae produced four different designs for the proposed building. Of the four designs that McRae produced for the proposed building, the design which was reminiscent of Romanesque architecture was selected. Construction for the sandstone building began in 1893 and was completed in 1898. Despite being a three-storey arcade containing two hundred shops, the building did not garner much popularity, and became subject to outer and inner renovations in 1917–1918.

A plan was announced in 1959 by the then Lord Mayor of Sydney, Harry Jensen, to demolish the building and have it replaced by a civic square and a car park. The fate of building was not decided until twelve years later in 1971, when the Council of Sydney decided to let the building remain as a testament to the heritage it possessed.

In 1980 a bid by the Malaysian property developer Ipoh Garden Berhad was accepted by the council to restore the building on a profit-sharing lease of 99 years. Thus, a major renovation process was begun, where internal aspects of the building such as offices, floors, and partitions were demolished in the name of the restoration of the building. It was eventually reopened in 1986 and became one of Sydney's most popular shopping centres and tourist destinations.

The Queen Victoria Building stands as a memorial for its namesake, Queen Victoria, and hosts a statue of her on Druitt Street that was originally erected in Dublin, Ireland, in 1908. After the establishment of the Irish Free State in 1922, growing anti-British sentiment translated into the desire to have the statue removed, as Victoria's presence was no longer welcome. Eventually, Director of Promotions for Ipoh Gardens Ltd Neil Glasser contacted the Director of the National Museum of Ireland, a correspondence that resulted in the statue being transported to Sydney as "on loan until recalled". It was unveiled on 20 December 1987, and was visited less than five months later by Queen Elizabeth II, the great-great-granddaughter of Queen Victoria.

The traditional owners of the land on which the Queen Victoria Building was built are the Cadigal and Wangal tribes of the Eora nation.

==== Today ====
In 2010 the Queen Victoria Building was added to the New South Wales State Heritage Register, officially making it a state heritage site. In 2018, the building celebrated its 120-year anniversary by hosting a night-time celebration that featured live music and entertainers.

=== Port Arthur ===
The Port Arthur site is a convict settlement located 97 km south east of Hobart in Tasmania. The site serves as a historical reminder of British settlement within Australia, and is considered one of Australia's oldest continuous tourist attraction due to its historical significance. Some of the features of the complex involves mostly the buildings on the site, all of which hold significance to the story of the Australian convict, including the asylum, the commanders house, the hospital, the military compound and more. This site is a monument to the Australian people as it serves as a reminder of the history that surrounds the settlement and establishment of Australia.

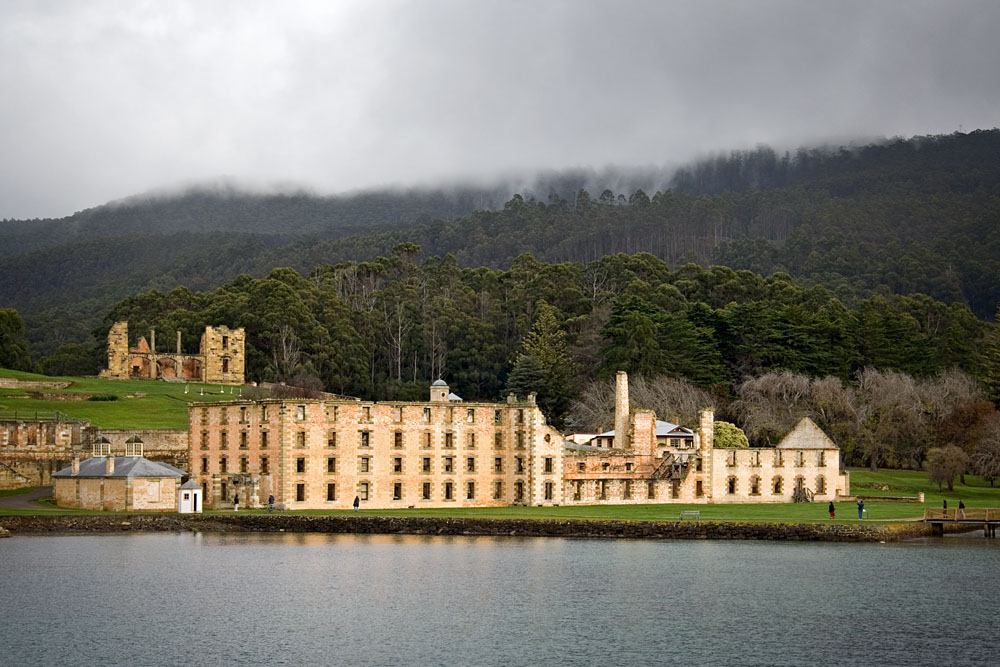
Port Arthur, Tasmania, Australia

== Early 20th century monuments ==
=== Flinders Street railway station ===
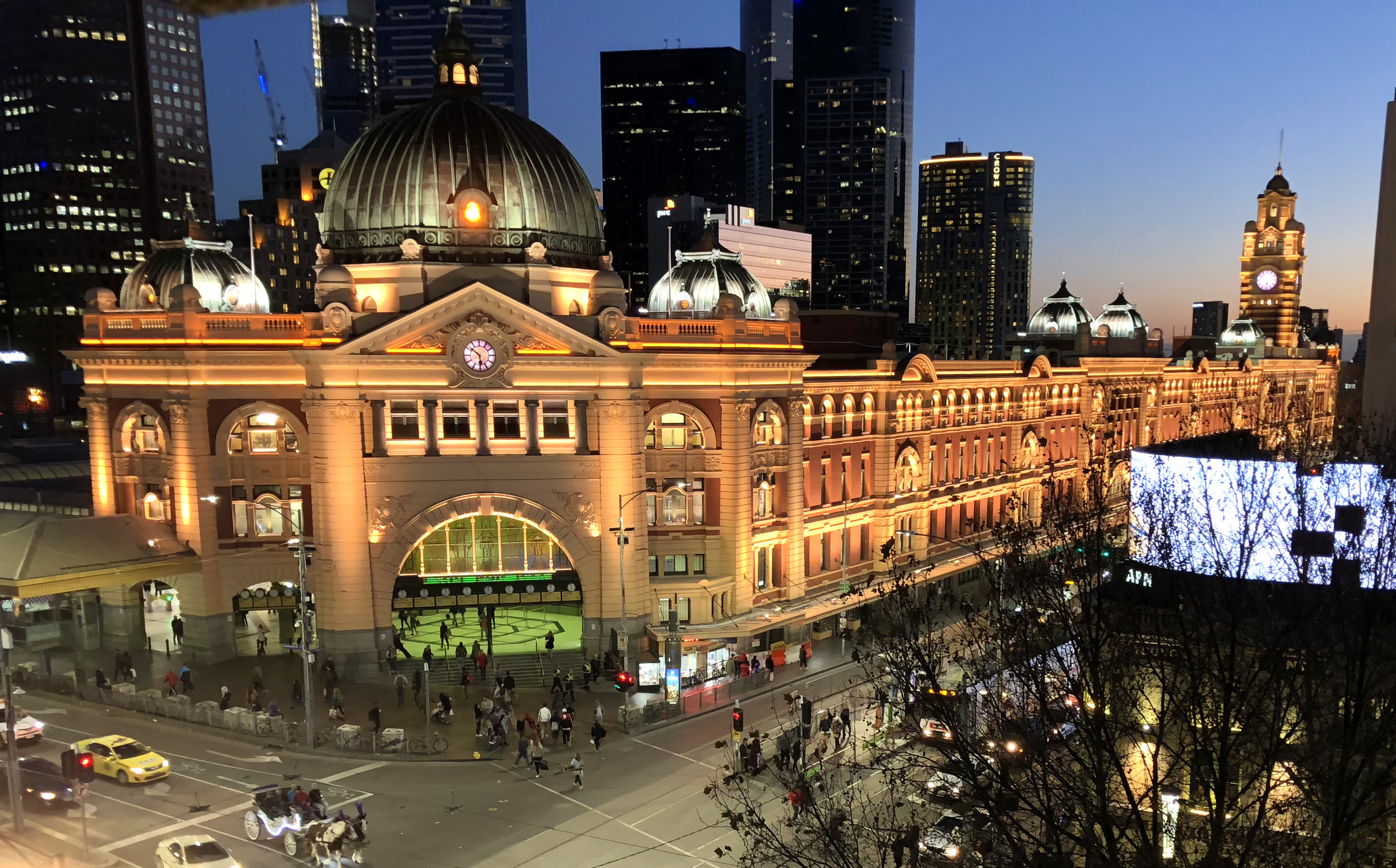
Flinders Street railway station

Situated on the corner of the Flinders and Swanston streets in Melbourne's central business district, the current Flinders Street railway station began undergoing construction in 1899 and was completed in 1910, and is one of the Melbourne's most well-known and often used public facilities. Its architecture is a combination of Edwardian Free style and 1900s French public architecture, and is Australia's largest building façade.

==== History ====
There have been some myths surrounding the origin of the plans that were used for the construction of the station. One such myth in the 1930s was that the plans were mistaken for the plans of a station in Mumbai. This myth likely arose from information contained in newspapers in the 1890s that referred to India as a result of some exotic railway station designs, of which some were proposed for a station in Spencer Street. In 1933 a new Railways Nursery was opened on the second floor of the station, which was open to anyone who wanted to leave their young children in supervised care for the day. At this time, it was one of three such types of nurseries in the world, and even though it was only open for less than nine years, 55,000 young children had attended.

The Flinders Street station was built on land of the Boonwurrung, a people of the Kulin nation. Their land spans from the Werribee River to Wilsons Promontory in Victoria, as well as the metropolitan city of Melbourne and its suburbs.

==== Today ====
In early 2015 Daniel Andrews, Victoria's Premier, and Jacinta Allan, Victorian Minister for Public Transport, announced that the Victorian Government was going to invest $100 million for the purpose of revitalising Flinders Street Station. This would be used to fulfil urgent refurbishment needs of the station, including its platforms, entrances, toilets, and information displays. There are also plans to repair older aspects of the station, such as the ballroom, in hopes of revitalising commercial activity. In 2018, a new entrance to the station was built to better manage pedestrian traffic, and several improvements were made to the station's surveillance system.

240 new CCTV cameras as well as a new intruder alarm system were installed inside the City Loop of the station to reduce the disruptions that would be often caused by trespassers. The alarm system, which was switched on in 2019, is able to identify when someone illegally enters on the Loop's four tunnels. In 2016, there were approximately sixty intrusions that resulted in major delays to the train services. In 2017, intrusions were reduced to approximately 50%, and the renovation investment was aimed at further decreasing the intrusion figures. In addition to the improved surveillance system, a new entrance was connected from Southbank to the stations’ platform 10, which services the busy Werribee-Williamstown line. This was aimed at reducing the congestion that would often occur on the Elizabeth Street pedestrian underpass, which was also improved as part of the $100 million upgrade.

== Modern monuments ==
=== Parliament House ===
Parliament House is in Canberra, and is the location that the Australian government convene for parliamentary matters. The building completed its construction on 26 January 1988, and was opened on 9 May 1988 by Queen Elizabeth. The building is significant due to its use by the federal government as an area of meeting for the Australian parliament, and the building contains many rooms significant to the workings of the Australian government, such as the Senate and the House of representatives, all of which is designed to be welcoming to visitors as a staple of the Australian way of life.

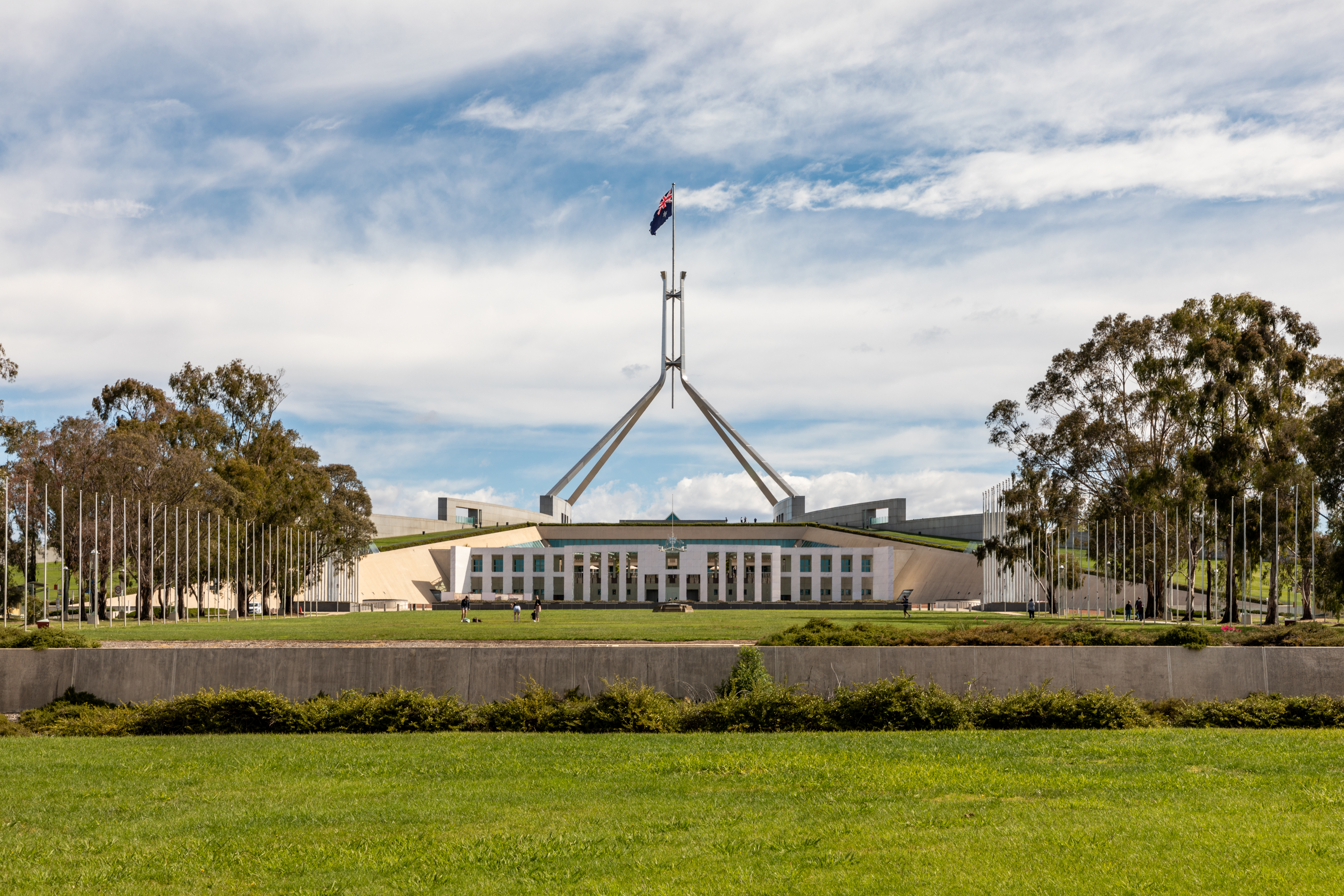
Parliament House, Canberra, NSW, Australia

==== History ====
Before the current Parliament House was opened by Queen Elizabeth II on 9 May 1988, the seat of the Australian Parliament was in the Old Parliament House in Canberra. Former Australian Prime Minister Malcolm Fraser initiated the construction of the New Parliament House on Capital Hill in Canberra. Over ten thousand people were involved in the construction, with the majority of the materials used being of Australian origin. The overall cost of the building was $1.1 billion, and is one of the southern hemisphere's largest buildings.

Due to the Parliament House's subterranean design, all natural vegetation, ancient surface geological features, and the hill that the House stands in place of were removed completely. The excavation that was done in preparation for the building of the House resulted in a moving of more than one million cubic metres of soil and rock, 170,000 cubic metres of which were permanently removed. All the landscaping in the Parliament House is not natural, but artificial. In 1981, Malcolm Fraser ceremoniously poured the first concrete to commence the construction of the Parliament House. Previous natural sightseeing landmarks were rendered unavailable by the buried position of the Parliament House in the hill.

In 1997, after the Parliament House had been home to the Australian government for nine years, Fraser stated that he believed that his approval of the new Parliament House was his "one very serious mistake".

The Parliament House was built on the land of the Ngunnawal people of the Ngunnawal Country.

==== Today ====
There has been some modern criticism on many aspects of the Parliament House, namely its design. Former Australian prime minister Malcolm Turnbull previously stated that the House's architecture did not suit its function as it is very large and thus does not have a "collision space" where politicians of differing affiliations could come across one another and discuss important issues that were relevant to Parliament activity. Turnbull argued that the design of the Parliament House was not conducive to the purpose it was meant to serve as it did not "bring people together to meet and hopefully compromise and agree and discuss", which was the reason for the fact that "there are less cross-party friendships than there were in the old parliament".

=== Australian War Memorial ===
The Australian War Memorial is a monument situated in Canberra. The Monument is used to memorialise the armed forces and partner organisations who served in the World Wars. It was opened 1941 by the Prime Minister at the time, John Curtin, championed by C.E.W. Bean. This Australian Memorial serves as a reminder to the Australian public of their country's service during the World Wars, making it a monument directed at the Australian identity and pride. The monument has many important features, such as the Commemorative Area, Memorial Building, Sculpture Garden and more, all of which hold different significant value to the memorial. It is at the end of the Remembrance Driveway/Anzac parade.

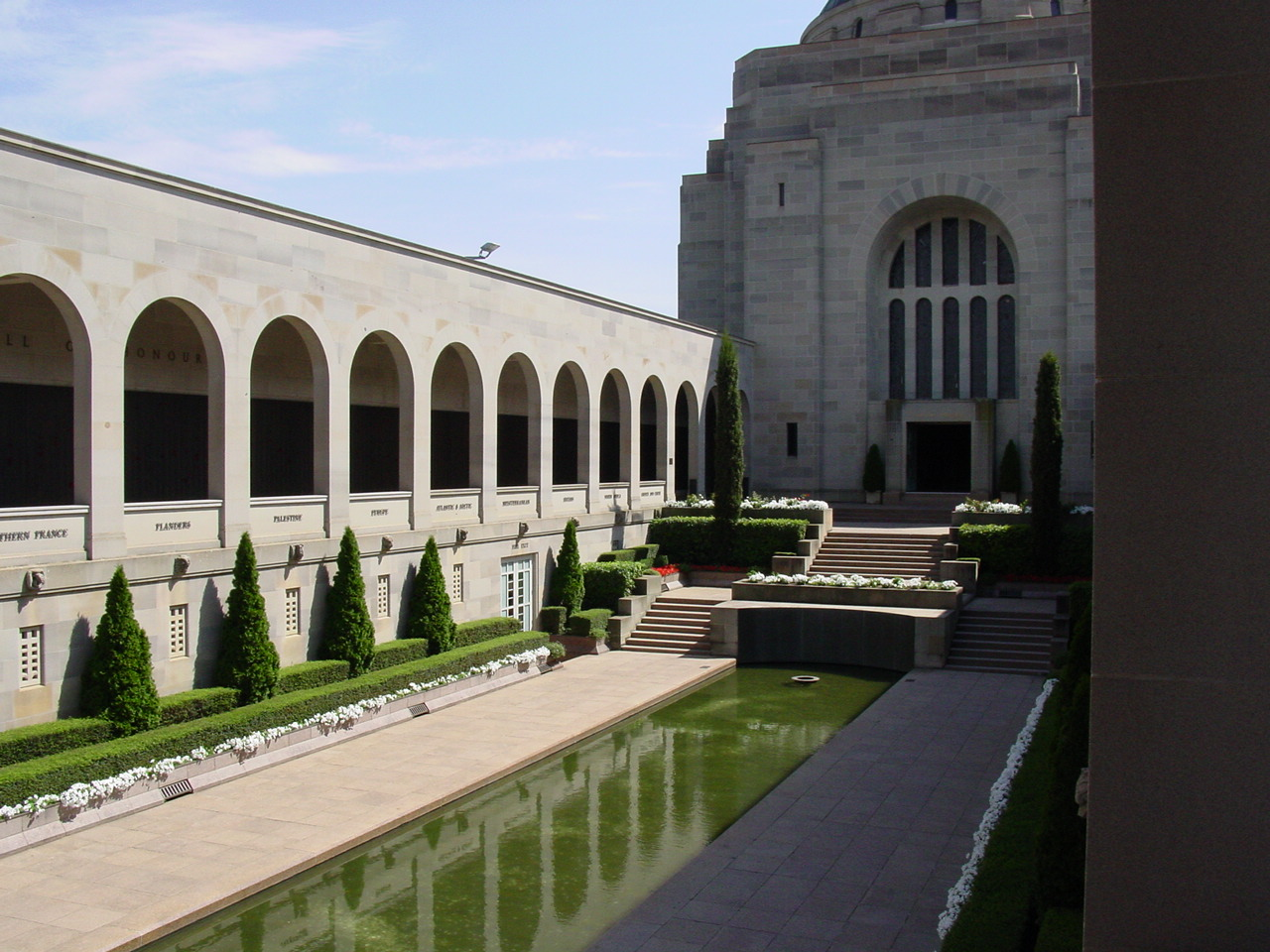
Australian War Memorial, Canberra, NSW, Australia

=== Sydney Opera House ===
Located in Sydney, the Sydney Opera House is a performance building known for its architecture and role within the performing arts community in Australia. The building is considered one of the biggest attractions within the country, and is listed on the world heritage site as a "masterpiece of 20th century architecture." The building was opened on 20 October 1973, and is attended by roughly 1.2 million people per year.

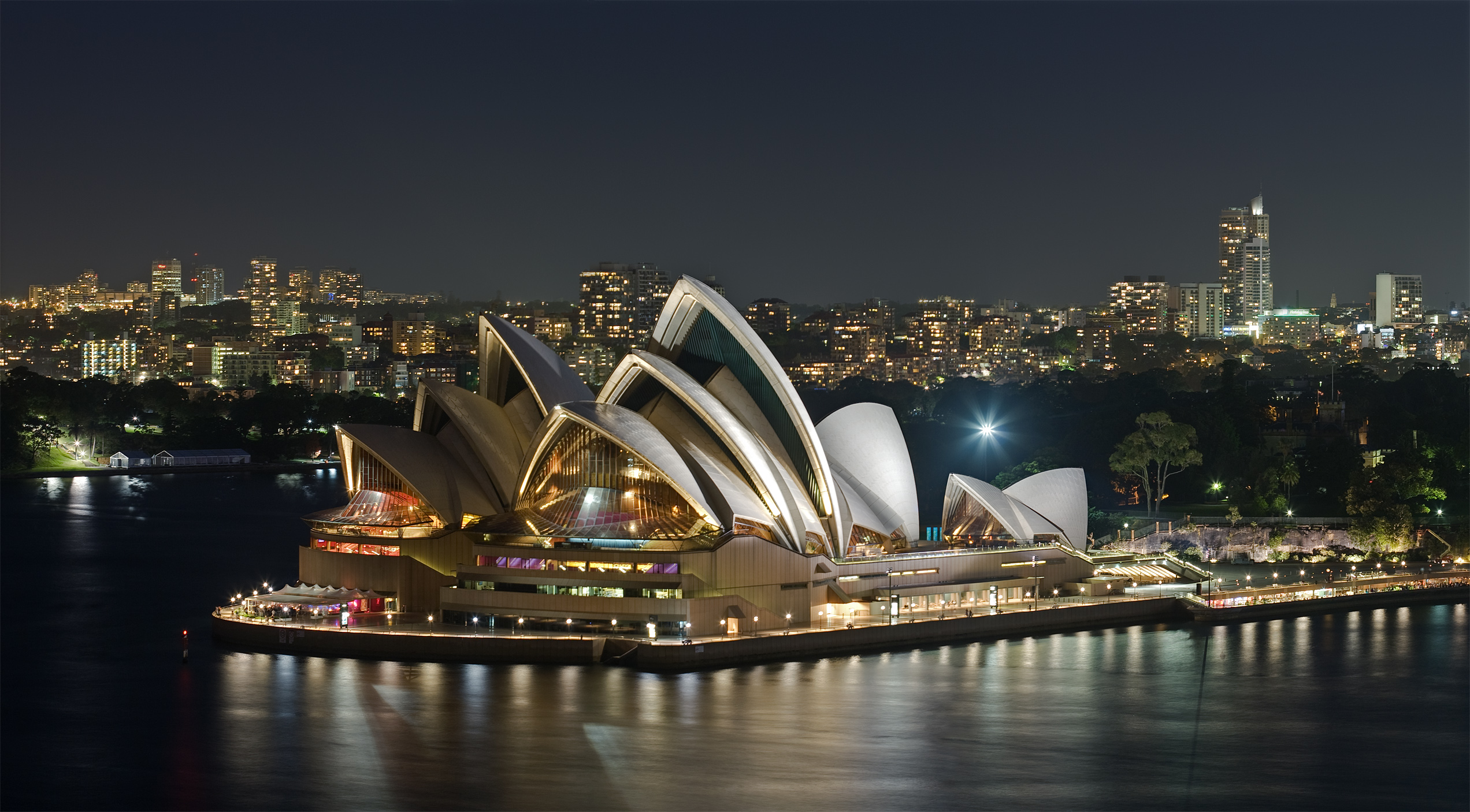

=== Shrine of Remembrance ===
The Shrine of Remembrance is in Victoria, and is one of the biggest memorial sites in the country. Construction finished on 11 November 1934, and since completion the site has been used as the place for observance days, including Anzac Day and Remembrance Day. The memorial main function is to pay respect to the men and women who served within the world wars, specifically World War 1, and is a place of education, as well as serving a purpose of being somewhere in which the Australian Public within Victoria is reminded of their service.

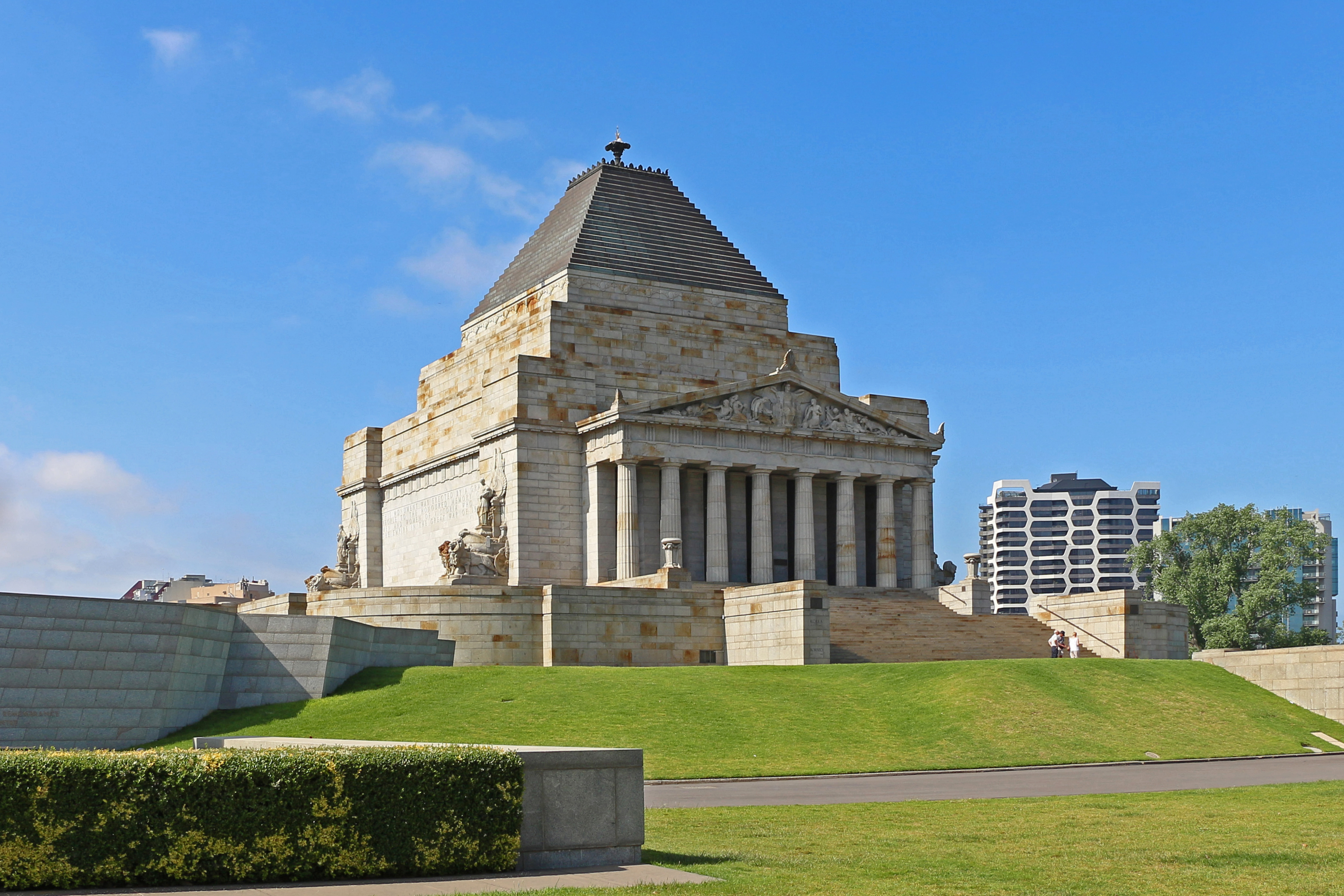
Shrine of Remembrance, Melbourne, Victoria, Australia

=== Sydney Harbour Bridge ===
The Sydney Harbour Bridge is one of Australia's most well recognised monuments, with over 10 million people visiting the site a year. The Bridge finished construction and subsequently opened in 1932, and on 19 March 2007 was added onto the Australian National Heritage Listing. The Bridge serves as one of the main roads into the central part of the city, as well as being a large tourist attraction, with features such as The Bridge Climb.

Sydney Harbour Bridge, Sydney, NSW, Australia

=== Centre Point Tower ===
Also known as the Sydney Tower, the Centre Point tower is located in the CBD of Sydney. The tower is known for being the tallest building in Sydney, as well as being the second tallest observation tower in the southern hemisphere. The tower began construction in 1975, and became open to public use in 1981 and since then has been involved in many important cultural events, including the 2000 Sydney Olympic games, and as such stands as an important monumental feature to the Australian people.

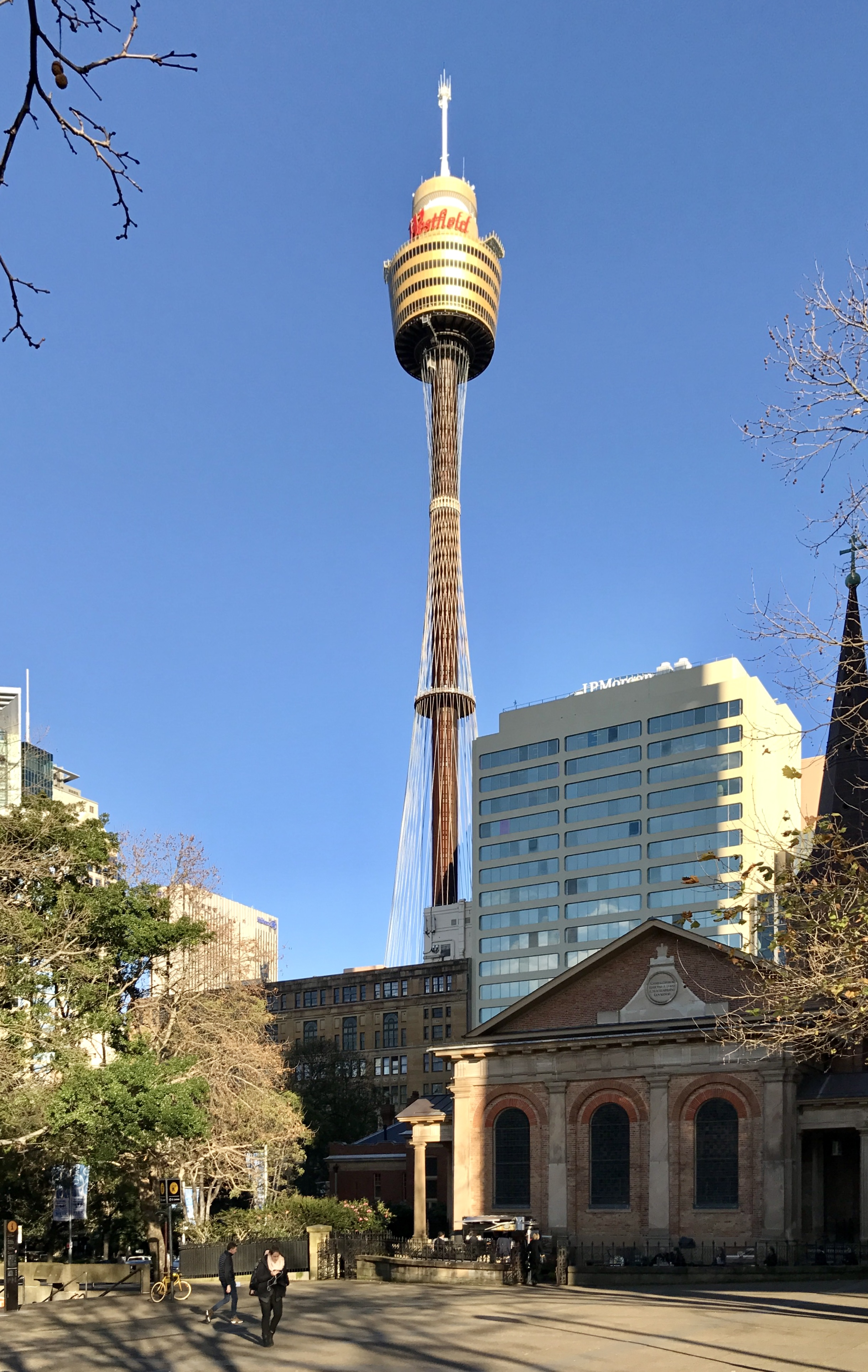
Centre Point Tower (Sydney Tower), Sydney, NSW, Australia

=== Sovereign Hill ===
Sovereign Hill is an open site set to imitate the local area during and after the initial Gold Rush that overtook Ballarat, Victoria, Australia in the mid-1800s. Open since 1970, the site spans across almost 15 hectares of land, and many facilities are included in the complex; such as bars, café's and museums. The complex routinely participates in real-life re-enactments of everyday life for those who lived in the era, and as such over 200,000 people visit the site every year.

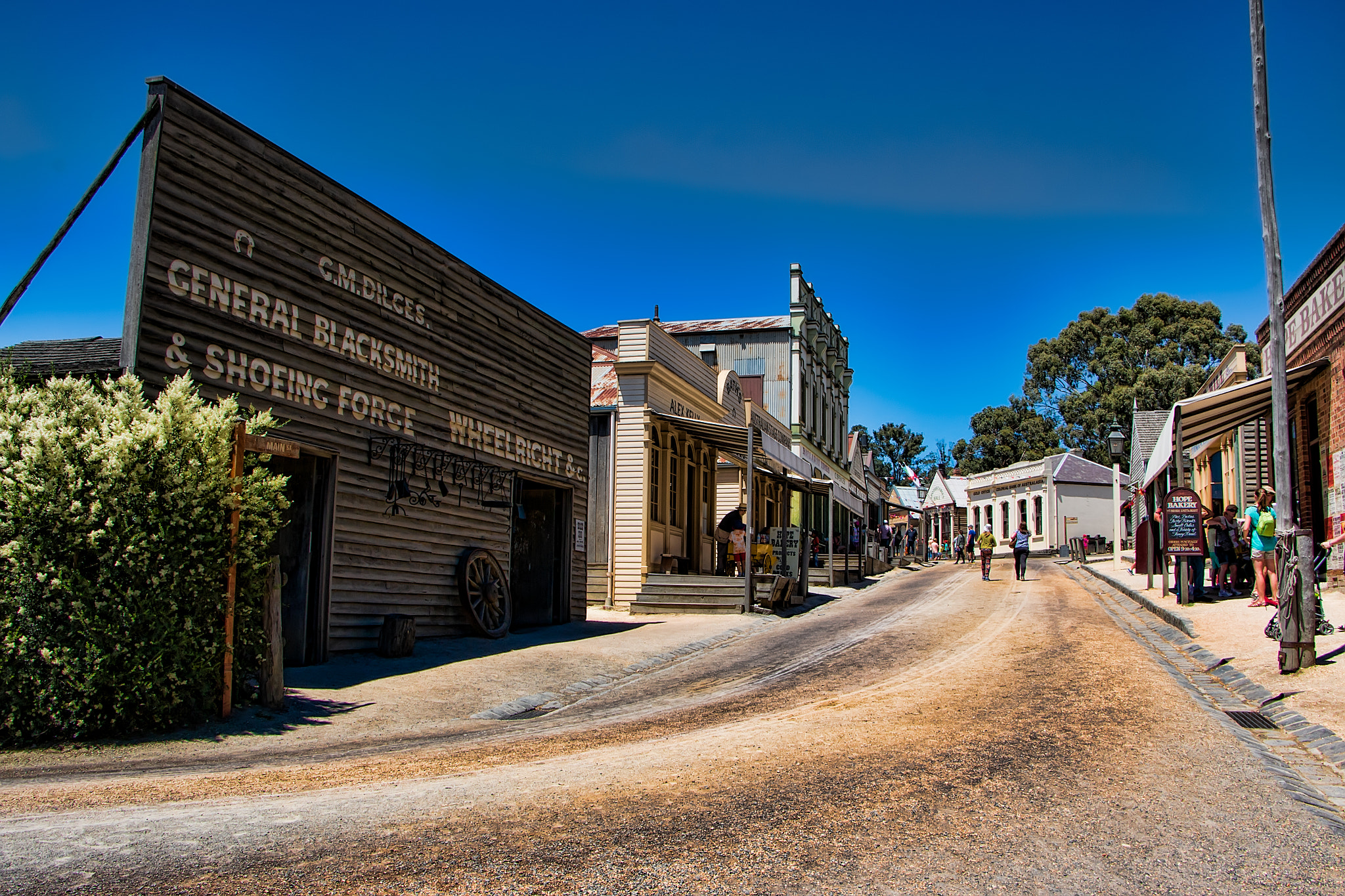
Sovereign Hill, Ballarat, Victoria, Australia

== List of other Australian monuments ==
Australian monuments:
Name	Location
Big Pineapple	Woombye, Queensland
Big Ram	Goulburn, NSW
Big Banana	Coffs Harbour, NSW
Kangaroo Island	Kangaroo Island, Australia
Melbourne Cricket Ground	Melbourne, Victoria
Shark Bay	Western Australia
Royal Botanical Gardens	Sydney
Twelve Apostles	Port Campbell National Park, Victoria

== See also ==
- Culture of Australia
