= Ngalia =

Ngalia, Ngaliya or Ngalea may refer to:

- Ngalia (Western Desert), an Aboriginal people of the Western Desert in Western Australia and South Australia
  - Ngalia (Ngalea or Ooldean), a dialect of the Western Desert language
- Ngalia (Northern Territory), an Aboriginal Australian people of the Northern Territory
  - Ngaliya, a dialect of the Warlpiri language
- Ngalia Basin, a sedimentary basin in central Australia

== See also ==
- Mantjintjarra Ngalia, a union of the Western Desert Ngalia and Mantjintjarra
