= Musgrave Block =

Geologic formation in Australia

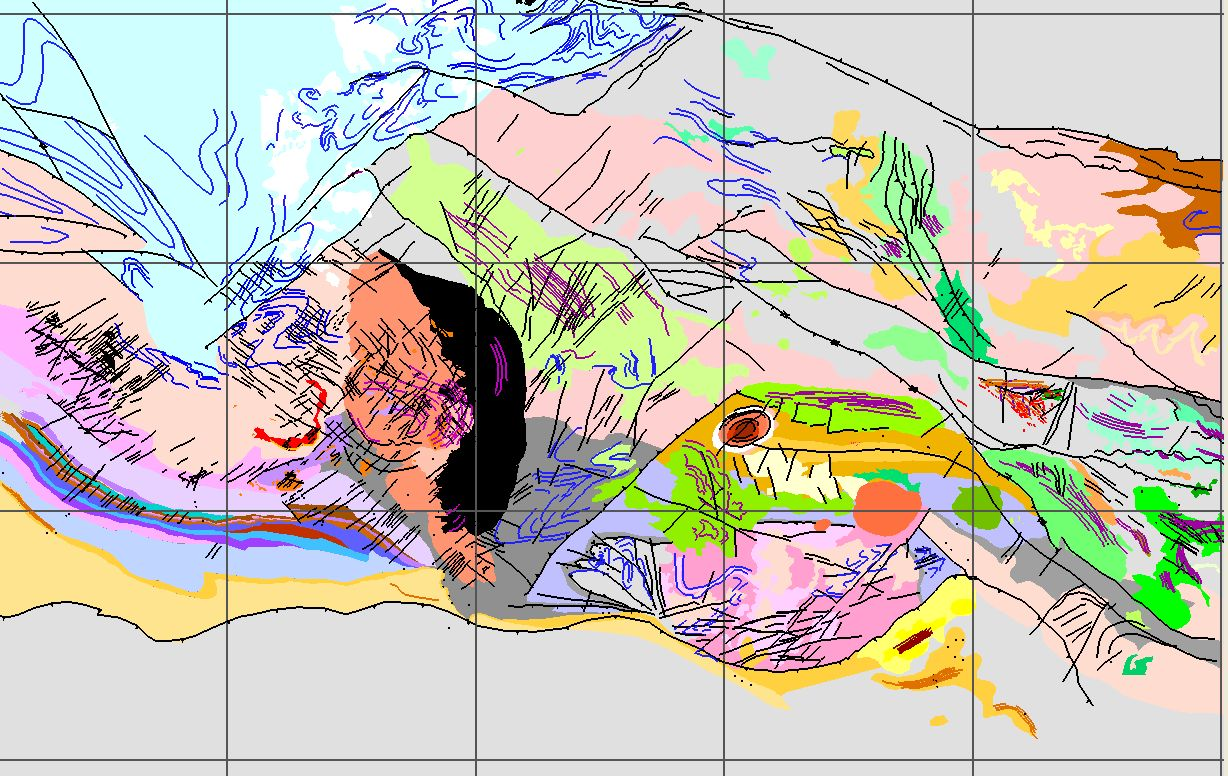
Geological interpretation of the West Musgrave Block, Western Australia. 50x50km grid for scale.

The Musgrave Block (also known as the Musgrave Province) is an east-west trending belt of Proterozoic granulite-gneiss basement rocks approximately 500 kilometres (310 mi) long. The Musgrave Block extends from western South Australia into Western Australia.

The Musgrave Block is primarily exposed through the actions of the Petermann Orogeny at c. 535-550 Ma, which exhumed the orogenic belt along the Woodroffe Thrust.

== Geomorphology of Quaternary deposits ==
The Musgrave Block is currently passive geologically, with surficial processes described as residual erosion. The area currently experiences on average less than 150mm (6 inches) of rainfall per annum, which provides little surface runoff and hence virtually no erosion.

The landforms of the area are primarily composed of wide calcrete plains, often covered by Pleistocene Age aeolian deposits of sand dunes, sometimes reworked into ephemeral sheetwash fans. Outcrop is rare, restricted primarily to the igneous rocks of the Giles Complex and several granite domes, gneiss domes and isolated outcrops.

This area is also a distinct physiographic province of the larger West Australian Shield.

== Palaeozoic rocks ==
Several Palaeozoic to neoproterozoic sedimentary basins onlap the Musgrave Block, and are exposed mostly around its edges. These were derived from erosion of the Musgrave Block basement during the neoproterozoic to Permian.

== Proterozoic basement ==
The Proterozoic of the Musgrave Block is composed of seven main classes of rocks:

- Surficial volcanics of c.1050 to 1080 Ma, both mafic (Mummawarrawarra Basalt) and andesitic to rhyolitic (Tollu, Smoke Hill Volcanics) and the Bentley Supergroup volcanics and sediments of c. 1080 Ma
- Large intrusive caldera type granite intrusive complexes (Palgrave, Skirmish Hill, Smoke Hill), possibly of c. 1050 and likely no older than 1080 Ma
- Partly metamorphosed, rarely dissected c. 1080 Ma granite
- Usually unmetamorphosed, rarely dissected granites of a c. 1050 intrusive suite
- Partly metamorphosed, dissected intrusive rocks of the mafic-ultramafic c. 1080 Ma Giles Complex
- Highly metamorphosed metagranites of the c. 1200 Ma suite
- High-grade crystalline metamorphic basement rocks of c. 1550-1300 Ma age

The Musgrave Block is flanked by several Proterozoic to Palaeozoic sedimentary basins, whose sedimentary history can elucidate the timing of tectonic events in the Musgrave Block post-1080 Ma. These include the Proterozoic Amadeus and Officer Basins.

== Events ==
The most illustrating way of considering the Musgrave Block is as part of a time-space plot in which geological events are arrayed in time against rock units, stratigraphic relationships and for correlative purposes.

The key events in the Musgrave Block are:

- Protolith formation ~1550 Ma. Formation of crustal rocks of the Birksgate Complex, which are both mafic and felsic in composition.
- Igneous event and orogeny ~1300 Ma inferred from geochronology and distribution of felsic “volcanic” supracrustal sequence of the high grade gneisses
- Musgravian orogeny at ~1200 Ma including generation of voluminous Kulgera Suite of granites and metamorphosis of the Birksgate Complex and ~1300 supracrustal sequence to amphibolite-granulite facies
- Warakurna Large igneous province at 1076 ± 6 Ma including the intrusion of the Giles Complex and the Winburn Suite of granites, plus deposition of the Bentley Supergroup (including Tollu and Smoke Hill Volcanics)
- Amata Dyke Suite at ~830-880 Ma
- Petermann Orogeny, 535-550 Ma; marginal foreland basin formation, trending to crustal consolidation and quiescence
- Permian glaciation and erosion of Petermann Orogeny mountains; deposition of Permian sequences in Officer and Amadeus basins
- Intracontinental setting till present

== Granites and calderas ==
There are three main phases of granite intrusion into the Musgrave Block:

- Kulgera Suite at 1200 Ma
- At ~1080Ma synchronous with the Giles Complex
- Winburn Suite at ~1050Ma postdating the Giles Complex

The Kulgera Suite is a widespread, voluminous suite of fractionated amphibole-bearing plagioclase rich tonalite to granodiorites of an I-type affinity (Stewart, 2003). They are dated at ~1200 Ma and are considered to be related to melting of the lower crust during the ~1200 Ma Musgravian Orogeny. The Windburn Suite is considered to be an anorogenic A-type granite suite produced by anatexis of the lower crust at ~1080 to 1050 Ma by the injection of the mafic Giles Complex intrusions. They are in most cases poorly fractionated, biotite-muscovite granites, with little hornblende, a high radiometric count and the presence of fluorine. The 1080 Ma granites and 1050 Ma granites can be distinguished on geochemical grounds, the latter is perhaps created by the above process, and the earlier suite a hybrid between A-type and I-type granites formed by assimilation and mixing.

There are also significant granite caldera complexes, of many hundred square kilometres in area, which intrude the Musgrave Block. These are of the ~1050 Ma age, and are subvolcanic, possibly related to some of the ~1050 Ma volcanic rocks.

=== Palgrave Volcanic Association ===
The Palgrave Palgrave Volcanic Association is a large volcanic and granite caldera edifice of about 1500 square kilometres sandwiched between the Jameson Range Intrusion and the gneisses underlying the Bentley Supergroup volcanics.

The caldera is in two parts, an overlying volcanic edifice composed primarily of porphyritic rhyolite and dacite with occasional vent complex agglomerates, which shows prominent circular ring-complex faults, and the Winburn Granite which underlies the caldera and is primarily exposed in the east as a pink, potassium-feldspathic porphyry granite, the lower margins of which are weakly tectonised.

The whole caldera edifice is tilted to the southwest, which is why the Winburn Granite is exposed along the east and northeast.

=== Skirmish Hill Caldera ===
The Skirmish Hill Caldera is poorly exposed along the southern margin of the Musgrave Block and consists of granite and overlying? rhyolite. It has been traditionally seen as a potential source for the Tollu Volcanics.

The caldera is truncated on the north by a north-dipping thrust fault and is probably tilted to the south.

=== Other calderas ===
Several other prominent gravity and magnetic highs are arranged along the Mugrave Block strike line, one of which was drilled by BHP in the 1990s through 300m of Permian glacial sediments.

This caldera is composed of highly tectonised, stretched felsic volcanic rocks, interleaved with a significant thickness of equally sheared titaniferous differentiated mafic sills. The best interpretation of this, and probably also of the Palgrave Caldera is that they represent hot spots along the Musgrave Block where significant magma flux penetrated, formed volcanic calderas with large subvolcanic granite intrusions, and associated mafic volcanism.

The relationship of the large granite calderas to the 1050-1080 Ma volcanics has been postulated as one in which the granite calderas were the source for the intermediate and felsic volcanic rocks.

== Bentley Supergroup ==
The Bentley Supergroup Volcanics are a sequence of bimodal supracrustal volcanic rocks formed during the ~1080 Warakurna Large Igneous Province, and are widely considered comagmatic with the mafic to ultramafic Giles Complex intrusions.

The Bentley Supergroup is composed primarily of bimodal volcanism, with several hundred-metres thicknesses each of alternating rhyolite and basaltic volcanism adding up to several kilometres true thickness in the area of the Warburton Range to the southwest of the Palgrave caldera. The Bentley Supergroup is divided into the Cassidy Group, Pussycat Group and Tollu Group.

The prevailing theory of the formation of the Bentley Supergroup is that the Warakurna Large Igneous Province, primarily represented by the Giles Complex intruding into the lower crust, breached the crust and erupted voluminous basaltic lava flows, and when enough heat had been added to the crust by the massive intrusions below, intracrustal felsic and intermediate melts were produced, forming A-type intracontinental granites of the Winburn Suite, and the felsic volcanic rocks.

This created the typical bimodal volcanic signature of the Cassidy Group and Pussycat Groups; the Tollu Group is a bit different, and it is considered the product of the large granite calderas which were formed immediately after the Giles Complex magmatism. Giles (1980) and earlier mappers have assigned the MacDougall Formation, overlying Mummawarrawarra Basalt, intermediate Smoke Hill Volcanics and the Tollu Volcanics to the Bentley Supergroup.

There has been little real study done on the Bentley Supergroup Volcanics since the 1960s. Geochemical and petrological observations are few and far between or lacking comprehensive rare earth and trace elements suites. The Bentley Supergoup is poorly exposed in South Australia (if at all).
