= Alice Springs Orogeny =

Australian mountain building event

The Alice Springs Orogeny was a major intraplate tectonic (mountain building) episode in central Australia responsible for the formation of a series of large mountain ranges. The deformation associated with the Alice Spring Orogeny caused the vertically tilted sandstone layers of the iconic Uluru/Ayers Rock.

== Duration ==
The Alice Springs Orogeny was a long lived event, beginning approximately 450 million years ago and concluding about 300 million years ago, and it involved less than 100 km of distributed shortening.

== Extent ==
The Alice Springs orogeny was centred in an area that had previously been a marine sedimentary basin, and involved the thrusting up of the underlying metamorphic and igneous rocks of Proterozoic age.

The Alice Springs Orogeny had its beginnings in the Late Ordovician, continuing during the Silurian and Devonian, and by the Carboniferous the folding of the sedimentary deposits of the central Australian basins had produced the mountainous terrain of the MacDonnell Ranges area. Today we see only the eroded remnants of these former mountains in the MacDonnell Ranges and other ranges throughout much of central Australia.

Prior to the Alice Springs Orogeny the Amadeus, Georgina, Wiso and Ngalia sedimentary basins were adjoining. The Alice Springs Orogeny disentombed the Arunta Inlier during mainly south-directed thrusting. Sediment was eroded off the rising mountain belt to result in the deposition of thick foreland sediments which became incorporated into the remaining relics of the former sedimentary basin, becoming the Amadeus, Georgina and Ngalia basins that are preserved today.

=== General tectonics ===
Two major crustal blocks dominate Central Australia: the Palaeoproterozoic to Mesoproterozoic Arunta Block and the Mesoproterozoic Musgrave Block. The blocks now separate the Officer, Amadeus, Ngalia and Georgina Basins.

Central Australia has experienced two intraplate orogenic events involving significant north-south shortening: the late Neoproterozoic to early Cambrian Petermann Orogeny and the Devonian to Carboniferous Alice Springs Orogeny. The pattern of fault reactivation during these events is similar to the pattern of subsidence in the overlying basin. During the Alice Springs Orogeny, reactivation occurred along the most deeply buried faults, even in instances where those faults had remained inactive during the earlier Petermann Orogeny. The major Petermann-aged structures that were not buried during renewed subsidence were inactive during the Alice Springs Orogeny. The record of reactivation tells us that the presence of pre-existing faults is insufficient to localise deformation. The correspondence between the distribution of basement fault reactivation and subsidence patterns during the Petermann and Alice Springs Orogenies implies a link between relatively thick sedimentation and long-term lithospheric weakening. This link is also found to be compatible with the thermal effects of a thick sedimentary blanket.

Since both events involved significant north-south shortening, deformation is said to have occurred in response to a similarly oriented in-plane regional stress field. The combined effects of both the orogenic events resulted in the emergence of the Musgrave and Arunta Blocks from beneath the Centralian intracratonic basin, which is now represented by the Officer, Amadeus, Ngalia and Georgina Basins.

=== Localisation of strain ===
Deformation was not spatially continuous throughout the Alice Springs Orogeny, but focused at a number of discrete loci, situated along the current structural margins of the preserved basins and in areas of now-exhumed basement.

The factors that control distribution of intraplate deformation have been the subject of considerable discussion. Many people believe that the intraplate deformation of the Alice Springs Orogeny is localised by suitably oriented structural weaknesses such as faults. This theory is supported by the observation that many continental interior faults have experienced numerous episodes of reactivation during their history. Although shortening associated with the Alice Springs Orogeny was widespread, there are two major regions affected by significant basement involved deformation: the Redbank Shear Zone and the Officer Basin.

=== Redbank Shear Zone ===
The Redbank Shear Zone in the Arunta Block, is a reverse sense shear zone dipping north at about 45 degrees, and was the major structural feature reactivated during the Alice Springs Orogeny. This shear zone is associated with one of the largest gravity anomalies known from continental interiors. The Redbank Shear Zone also accommodates 25% of the apparent shortening.

Seismic and gravity data over the Arunta Inlier have provided a reasonable degree of constraint on the crustal architecture of this province and have demonstrated that the crust-mantle boundary is uplifted by 25 km along the lithospheric-scale Redbank Thrust Zone, and that this offset is sufficient to cause the relative gravity high.

The south-directed Redbank Shear Zone accommodated much of the exhumation and led to the unearthing of the Moho. The spectacular Macdonnell Ranges near Alice Springs are made up of Amadeus Basin sediments tilted as a consequence of exhumation associated with the Redbank Shear Zone.

=== Officer Basin ===
The second region occurs along the northern margin of the Officer Basin. In this basin the Alice Springs Orogeny caused reactivation of the Munyarai Thrust which had also undergone reactivation during the Petermann Orogeny. Shortening here resulted in southward thrusting of basement rocks belonging to the Musgrave Block across the northern margin of the basin.
