= Kata Tjuta =

Domed rock formations in Northern Territory, Australia

Kata Tjuṯa / Mount Olga
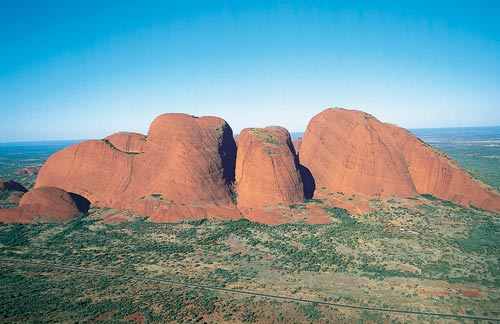

Highest point
- Peak: Mount Olga
- Elevation: 1,066 m (3,497 ft)
- Prominence: 487 m (1,598 ft)
- Coordinates: 25°18′S 130°44′E

Naming
- Native name: Kata Tjuṯa (Pitjantjatjara)

Geography
- Location within Northern Territory Location within Australia
- Location: Uluṟu-Kata Tjuṯa National Park

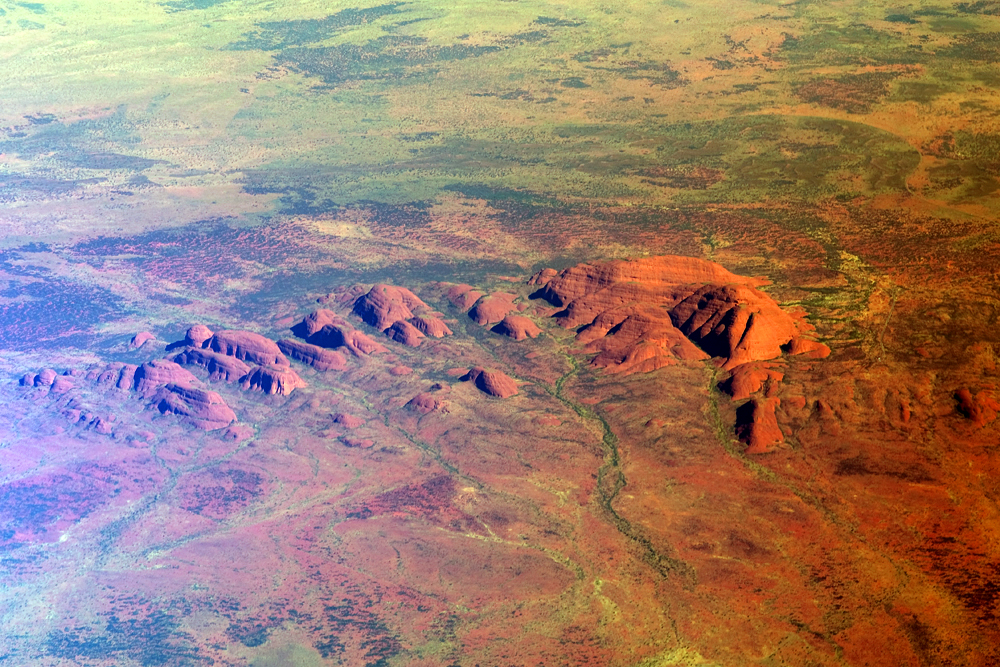
Aerial view of Kata Tjuṯa / Mount Olga

Kata Tjuṯa (Pitjantjatjara: Kata Tjuṯa, lit. 'many heads'; pronounced [kɐtɐ cʊʈɐ]), also known as The Olgas and officially gazetted as Kata Tjuta / Mount Olga, is a group of large, domed rock formations or bornhardts located about 360 km (220 mi) southwest of Alice Springs, in the southern part of the Northern Territory, central Australia. Uluṟu / Ayers Rock, located 25 km (16 mi) to the east, and Kata Tjuṯa / The Olgas form the two major landmarks within the Uluṟu-Kata Tjuṯa National Park. The park is considered sacred to the local Aboriginal community.

The 36 domes that make up Kata Tjuṯa / Mount Olga cover an area of 21.68 km^{2} (8.37 sq mi) are composed of conglomerate, a sedimentary rock consisting of cobbles and boulders of varying rock types including granite and basalt, cemented by a matrix of coarse sandstone. The highest dome, Mount Olga, is 1,066 m (3,497 ft) above sea level, or approximately 546 m (1,791 ft) above the surrounding plain (198 m (650 ft) higher than Uluṟu). Kata Tjuṯa is located at the eastern end of the Docker River Road.

== Name ==
Kata Tjuta, in the Pitjantjatjara dialect, is the traditional Aboriginal name for the formation, which translates into English as 'heads, many'.

The alternative name, The Olgas, comes from the tallest peak, Mount Olga. At the behest of Baron Ferdinand von Mueller, Mount Olga was named in 1872 by Ernest Giles, in honour of Queen Olga of Württemberg (born Grand Duchess Olga of Russia, daughter of Tsar Nicholas I). She and her husband, King Charles I of Württemberg, had marked their 25th wedding anniversary the previous year by, among other things, naming Mueller a Freiherr (baron), making him Ferdinand von Mueller. The naming was his way of repaying the compliment.

On 15 December 1993, a dual naming policy was adopted that allowed official names consisting of both the traditional Pitjantjatjara name and the English name. As a result, Mount Olga was renamed Mount Olga / Kata Tjuṯa. On 6 November 2002, following a request from the Regional Tourism Association, the order of the dual names was officially reversed, to Kata Tjuṯa / Mount Olga.

== Geologic origin ==
The region surrounding Kata Tjuṯa lies in the Amadeus Basin, an intracratonic basin formed during the Adelaidian, roughly 850–800 million years ago. During the Petermann Orogeny, approximately 550 million years ago, an event known as the Woodroffe Thrust lifted granulite facies rocks northward over low-grade metamorphic rocks. The eventual erosion of the formation resulted in a molasse facies, or deposition in front of rising mountains, in this case, the Petermann Orogeny, creating the deposit known as the Mount Currie Conglomerate. The Mount Currie Conglomerate is made predominantly of basalt, porphyry, granite, gneiss and volcanic rock fragments with a matrix composed of angular quartz, microcline and orthoclase among other minerals.

Both Uluṟu and Kata Tjuṯa are made of sediment originating in this Mount Currie Conglomerate and both have a chemical composition similar to granite. Scientists using Rubidium-strontium dating techniques to date the rock accurately have given it an age of 600 million years, matching the date of the Woodroffe Thrust event. The actual fresh rock that makes up the Kata Tjuṯa / Olgas and Uluṟu / Ayers Rock is medium to dark grey with green or pink hues in some laminae. The bright orange-red hue, for which the structures are noted, is due to a patina over finely divided feldspar coated in iron oxide.

== Legends ==
There are many Pitjantjatjara Dreamtime legends associated with this place and indeed everything in the vicinity including Uluṟu / Ayers Rock. A number of legends surround the great snake king Wanambi, who is said to live on the summit of Kata Tjuṯa and only comes down during the dry season. His breath was said to be able to transform a breeze into a hurricane in order to punish those who did evil deeds. The majority of mythology surrounding the site is not disclosed to outsiders, and in particular, women. As is the custom, should women become privy to the "men's business", they are susceptible to violent attacks, even death. The Anangu people believe the great rocks of Kata Tjuṯa are homes to spirit energy from the Dreaming, and since 1995 the site is being used once again for cultural ceremonies.

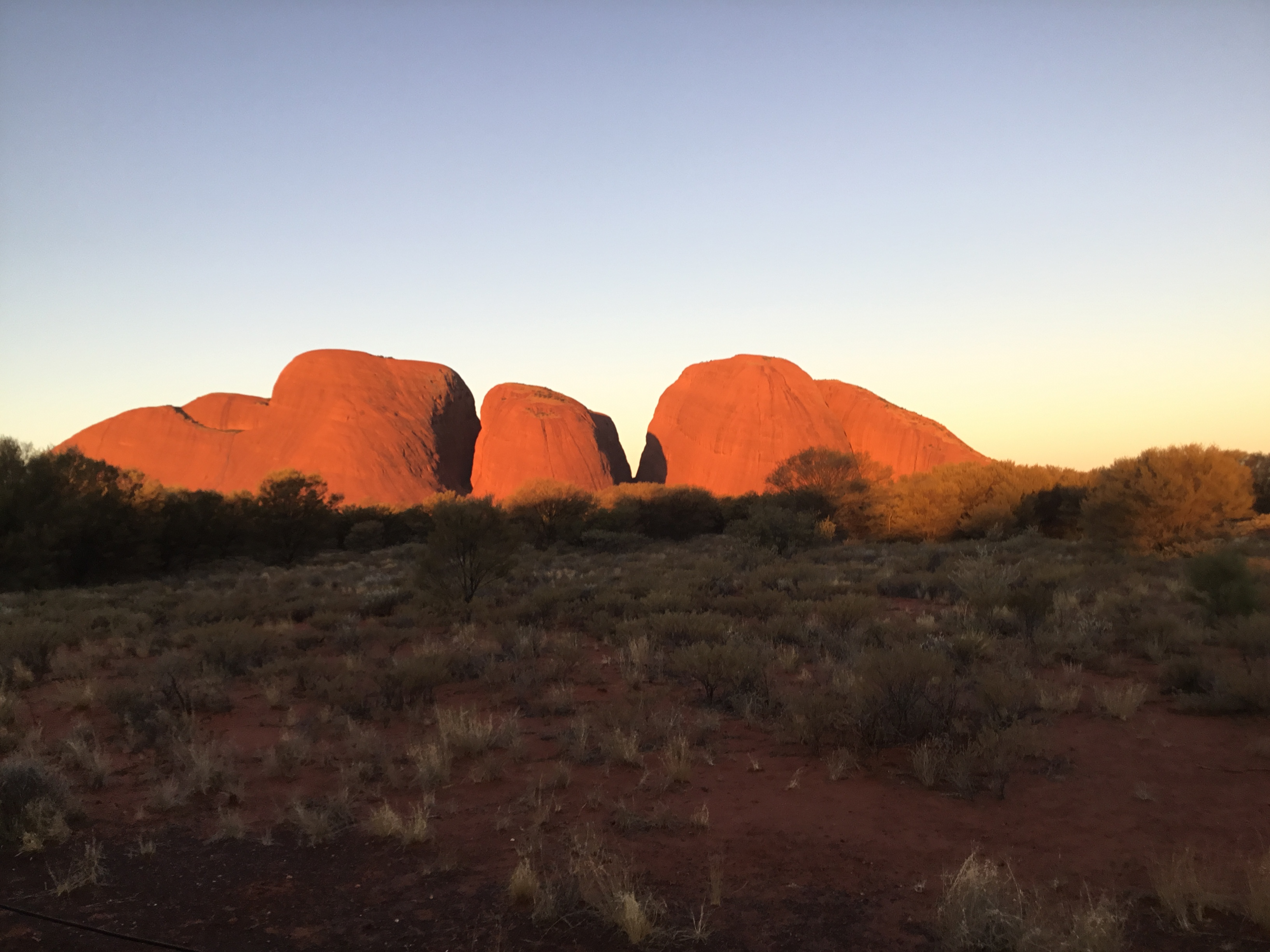
Kata Tjuta at dusk

== Locations, access and facilities ==
Kata Tjuṯa / Mount Olga can be reached via Ayers Rock Airport, followed by a 55-kilometre (34 mi) drive south, then west. Visitors are required to pay an entry fee. Kata Tjuṯa is about 495 kilometres (308 mi) by road from Alice Springs, via the Stuart and Lasseter highways. It is a 4 1/2 hour drive.

Kata Tjuṯa / Mount Olga has both a sunrise and sunset viewing area, which are accessible via a short walk from Kata Tjuṯa Road. There are also two walks that enter the domes of Kata Tjuta:

- Valley of the Winds - 7.4 km 7.4 km (4.6 mi) / 3–4 hours (Grade 4)
- Walpa Gorge walk - 2.6 km 2.6 km (1.6 mi) / 1–2 hours

== Gallery ==
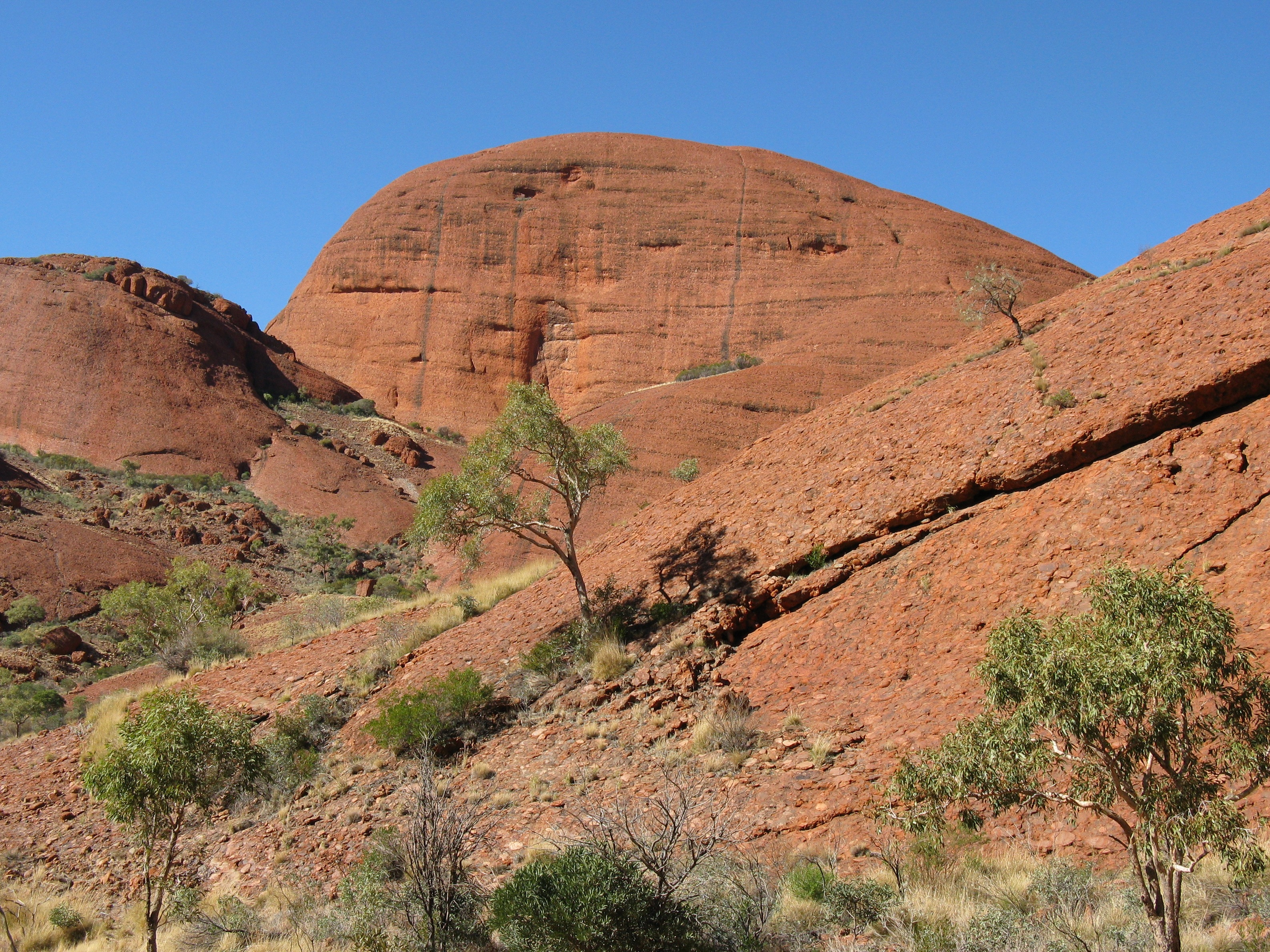
In the Valley of the Winds walk at Kata Tjuṯa / Mount Olga

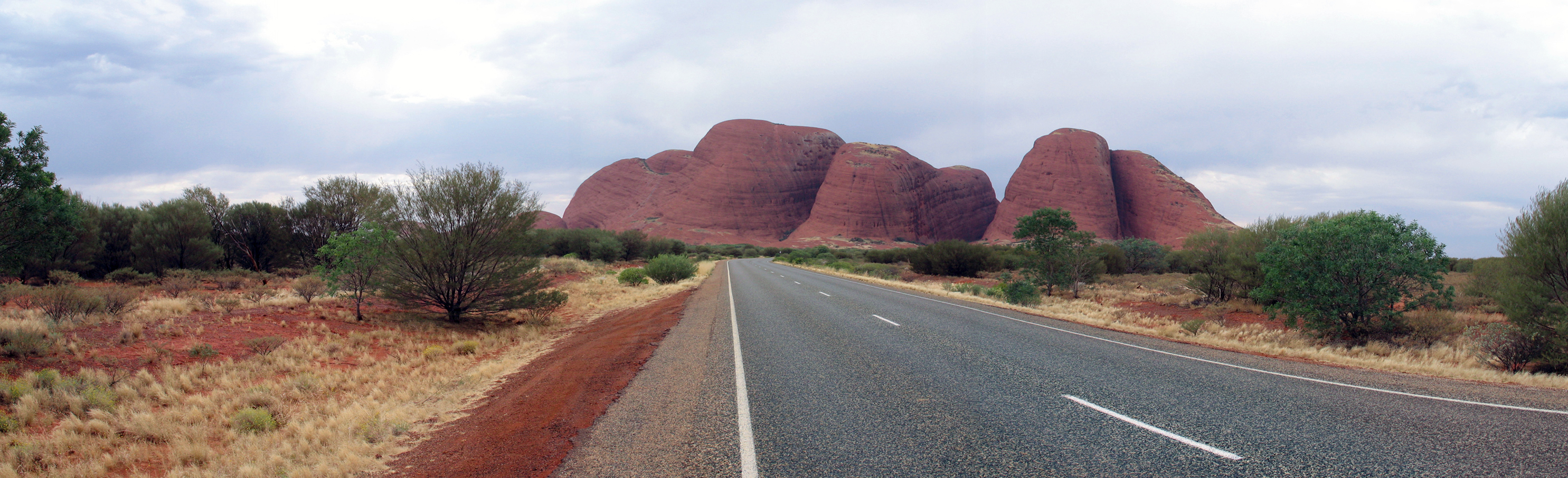
Kata Tjuṯa / Mount Olga

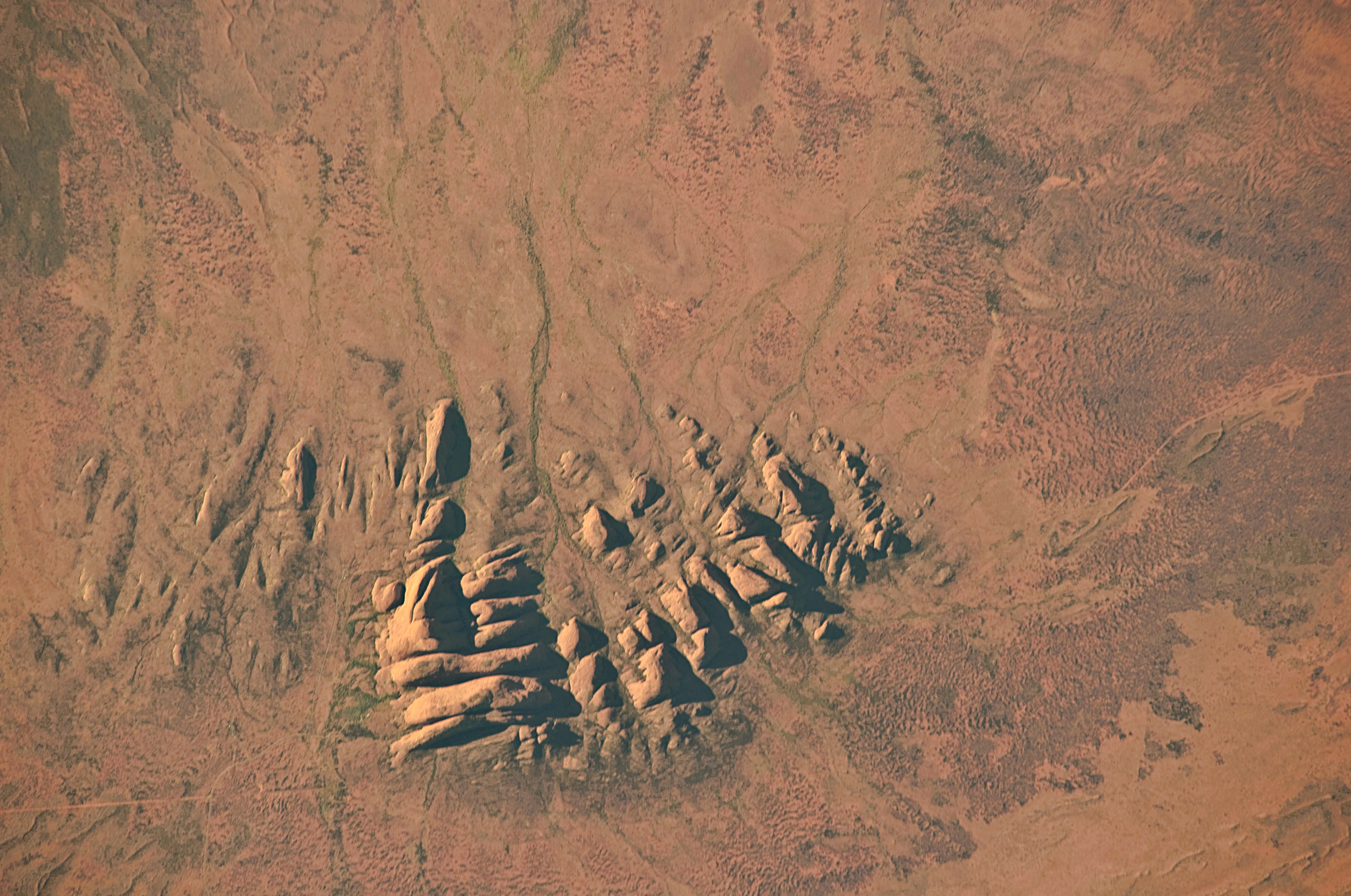
Astronaut photo of Kata Tjuṯa / Mount Olga

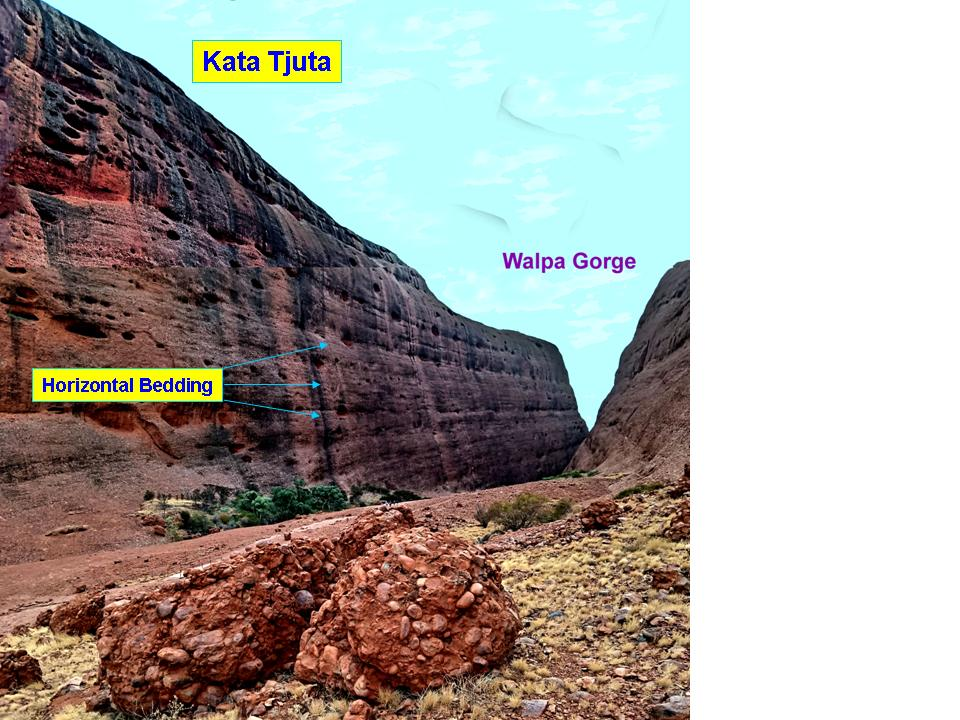
Fallen boulders of conglomerate off the cliff
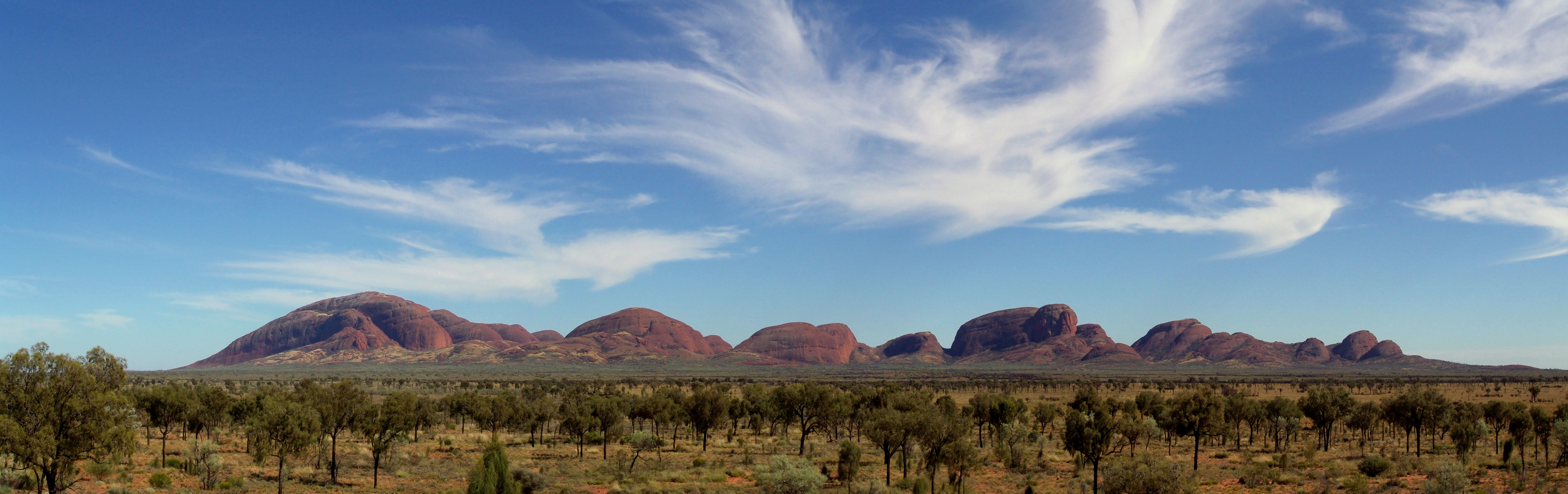
A panorama of Kata Tjuṯa / Mount Olga

== See also ==
- Ernest Giles
- Protected areas of the Northern Territory
- Recognition of sacred sites
- Tietkens expedition of 1889
