= Natural history of Australia =

Development of the earth

The natural history of Australia has been shaped by the geological evolution of the Australian continent from Gondwana and the changes in global climate over geological time. The building of the Australian continent and its association with other land masses, as well as climate changes over geological time, have created the unique flora and fauna present in Australia today. There are many species of flora and fauna that are unique to Australia, and do not exist in any other part of the world. The natural history of Australia begins with rock formation, followed by geological development, life evolution, and continues to change today.

== Precambrian ==
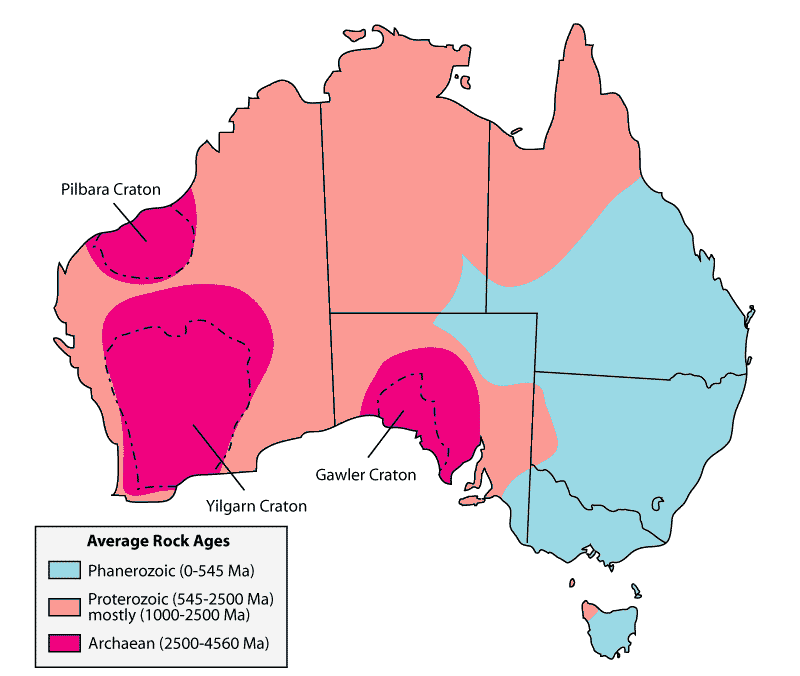
Australia was created by the junction of three early pieces of continental crust (cratons).

Three areas of the Australian landmass that are made of Archaean rocks are more than 2.5 billion years old, among the oldest known rocks. These igneous and metamorphic rocks are found in the Yilgarn (West) and Pilbara (North) cratons in today's Western Australia and the Gawler (South) craton which makes up the Eyre Peninsula in South Australia. During the Proterozoic, 2,500 to 545 Ma, continent building took place around the existing cratons; the accretions include sedimentary deposition of the banded iron formations and the formation of Australia's major orebodies – sources of gold, copper, lead, zinc, silver and uranium. These disparate landmasses are thought to have become associated by the tectonic collisions that formed the supercontinent Rodinia, between 1300 and 1100 Ma. Geological evidence suggests that the West Australian cratons collided first, followed by collision with the South Australian craton between ~830 and 750 Ma. The Centralian Superbasin formed the junction of the North, South and West cratons.

Rodinia broke up between 830 and 745 Ma; at around 750 Ma the western side of Rodinia called Laurentia broke away from the landmass made from Australia, India and Antarctica, forming a gap that would become the Pacific Ocean. Evidence of Rodinia is found in zircons, which are looked for when analyzing major geological events.

The Archean rocks from the Pilbara craton contain some of the first evidence of life, primitive cyanobacterial mats known as stromatolites. Soft-bodied organisms from the Ediacaran collectively known as the Ediacaran biota are found in sandstone around the Flinders Ranges in South Australia, notably at a site known as Wilpena Pound.

== Gondwana ==
Following the breakup of Rodinia, Australia, India and Antarctica made up a large landmass. During plate movements from 750 to 500 Ma South America and Africa moved toward India and Australia, and by 500 Ma South America and Africa had joined with them to form Gondwana.

During the Palaeozoic, 545 to 251 Ma, the present landmass of Australia saw two stages of geological development. From 545 to 390 Ma shallow warm seas covered parts of central Australia, with a series of volcanic arcs and deep water sedimentation in the east. During this period between 480 and 460 Ma the Larapinta Seaway extended across the centre of Australia. Cycles of sedimentation and volcanism formed new continental crust, forming eastern Australia. There was a major orogeny in eastern Australia from 387 to 360 Ma. The continent was affected by glaciation around 330 Ma.

The continents that had drifted away from Rodinia drifted together again during the Paleozoic: Gondwana, Euramerica, and Siberia/Angara collided to form the supercontinent of Pangea during the Devonian and Carboniferous periods, some 350 million years ago. Pangea was a short-lived supercontinent; it began to break apart again in the early Jurassic. While Pangea existed it created opportunities for intermixing of the flora and fauna.

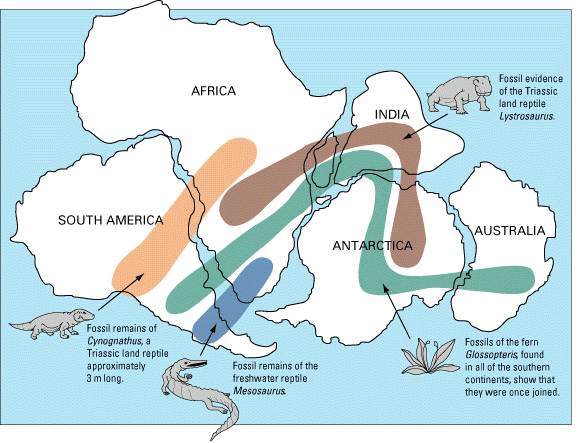
Gondwana as it formed in the Paleozoic

During the Carboniferous glaciation, erosion by ice extended into the Early Permian. Crustal extension and subsidence around 295 Ma formed shallow basins in which thick coal deposits were formed.

During the Mesozoic, when the Earth became much warmer, 251 to 140 Ma, the Australian landmass was covered with riverine plains. Humid conditions allowed the formation of peatlands, particularly in the east. Dinosaurs, reptiles and primitive mammals were present in Australia. Between 140 and 99 Ma, sea levels rose, and much of the continent was covered. In the same period (between 120 and 105 Ma), there was more volcanism in eastern Australia, leading to uplift creating the Tasman Sea to the southeast and the Coral Sea to the north.

The earliest land plants preserved in Australia occur in deposits from the Upper Silurian and the Lower Devonian in marine sediments in Victoria, named the Baragwanathia Assemblage for its most prominent element, the simple vascular plant the lycopod Baragwanathia. The assemblage also included Rhyniophyta, Zosterophyllophyta, and Trimerophyta in addition to other lycopods. All these plants were herbaceous, coastal and required an aqueous environment for reproduction. During the Devonian the first shrub-sized to tree-sized lycopods appeared in Australia and Antarctica; they dominated the flora until the Early Carboniferous. In the mid- to Late Carboniferous, as Australia drifted from equatorial latitudes to polar latitudes, the lycopods waned and were replaced by seed-ferns, and the Nothorhacopteris-Fedekurtzia-Botrychiopis complex.

Most of the modern Australian fauna had its origin in the Cretaceous. From pollen records from the Late Cretaceous it is proposed that the flora of the Cretaceous either evolved within the Austro-Antarctic region or entered Australia from Antarctica. Angiosperms evolved in the northern Gondwana/southern Laurasia during the Early Cretaceous and radiated worldwide. Prominent members of this early angiosperm flora were the Nothofagus.

Fossils found at Lightning Ridge, New South Wales, suggest that 110 million years ago Australia supported a number of different monotremes, but did not support any marsupials. Marsupials appear to have evolved during the Cretaceous in the contemporary northern hemisphere, to judge from a 100-million-year-old marsupial fossil, Kokopellia, found in the badlands of Utah. Marsupials would then have spread to South America and Gondwana. The first evidence of marsupials in Australia comes from the Tertiary, and was found at a 55-million-year-old fossil site at Murgon, near Kingaroy in southern Queensland. The Murgon fossil site has yielded a range of marsupial fossils, many with strong South American connections — unsurprising since the two continents were both a part of Gondwana. At Murgon evidence of a placental mammal, a Condylarth (Tingamarra porterorum), was discovered. Placental mammals were also found in North America and South America at this time. This find suggests that placental mammals did coexist with marsupials in Australia in the early Tertiary, although only marsupials persisted.

Regarding Australian Flora, the first evidence of life created by photosynthesis dates back to 3500 million years ago. The evidence of photosynthesis comes from sedimentary structures called stromatolites, which are built by photosynthesis. These are unambiguous records of life, as they still exist today.

== Isolation ==
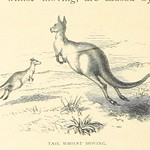
Kangaroo

The Devonian period (419–359 Ma) saw the first great diversification of fishes living within Australian freshwater basins and in marginal marine embayments. Australia has a rich fossil record of early amphibians which first appeared on the continent around 370–375 Ma, based on well-preserved tetrapod trackways at Genoa River, Victoria. The fossil record of reptiles in Australia starts in the Mesozoic era (250–66 Ma). The oldest of these remains are of Triassic age and comprise a few superficially lizard-like taxa such as Prolacertids (e.g. Kadimakara), and Thecodonts. The earliest significant Australian bird fossil is that of Nanantius, a small primitive flying bird known from one leg bone found in 110 Ma marine sediments in Queensland. Two of the world's three major groups of extant mammals had their origin in the Australian part of the Gondwana supercontinent, the monotremes and marsupials. The oldest mammal fossils from Australia are monotreme fossils from the Cretaceous of eastern and southeastern Australia, and consist of isolated jaws and postcranial bones from Lightning Ridge, New South Wales and sites near Inverloch, Victoria, dated at between 120 and 110 Ma. These mammals lived at a time when Australia comprised part of the supercontinent Gondwana, which at that time also included Antarctica and New Zealand.

Australia separated from Antarctica in the Late Eocene (c45-30 Ma), and initially remained warm and humid with rainforest vegetation. Inland Australia had systems of rivers and lakes with abundant wildlife. Fossil birds, platypus, frogs and snakes are present from this period. From 30 Ma there was a period of global cooling, and from 15 Ma the Antarctic ice sheet formed. Sand deserts and large inland salt lakes formed within the last 5 Ma. Climatic oscillation during the Pleistocene over the last million years led to repeated phases of glaciation with lower sea levels that linked Australia to New Guinea, and warmer interglacial periods with higher sea levels.

As early as the Miocene (23 to 5.3 Ma) and into the Pleistocene (20,000–50,000 years before present) the Australian megafauna developed. The megafauna became extinct in the late Pleistocene, at a time coinciding with both a period of climate change and the first human habitation of Australia. Recent analysis suggests that the fire-stick farming methods of the Australian Aborigines reduced plant diversity and contributed to the extinction of large herbivores with a specialised diet, like the flightless birds from the genus Genyornis. The World Heritage-listed Naracoorte Caves in South Australia are the best record of the Australian megafauna. The placental mammals made their reappearance in Australia in the Pleistocene, as Australia continued to move closer to Indonesia, both bats and rodents appearing reliably in the fossil record. The geographic isolation of Australia created a sharp division between Australian fauna and Asian fauna at the Wallace Line.

== See also ==
- Geology of Australia
- List of Australian and Antarctic dinosaurs
- Natural history of New Zealand
- South Polar dinosaurs

== Notes and references ==
=== References ===
- G. R. Dyne & D. W. Walton, ed. (1987). Fauna of Australia (Volume 1A – General Articles). Canberra: Australian Government Publishing Service. ISBN 0-644-06055-7.
- Johnson, David P. (2004). The Geology of Australia. Cambridge University Press. ISBN 0-521-84121-6.
- Hill, R. S.; E. M. Truswell; S. McLoughlin; M. E. Dettman (1999). "The Evolution of the Australian Flora: Fossil Evidence Volume 1—Introduction". In A. E. Orchard and H. S. Thompson (ed.). Flora of Australia (2nd ed.). Australian Biological Resources Study/CSIRO Publishing. pp. 251–320. ISBN 0-643-05965-2.
