= Ngalia Basin =

Sedimentary basin in central Australia

Coordinates: 22°30′S 131°30′E

The Ngalia Basin is a small (ca. 15,000 km^{2}) intracratonic sedimentary basin in central Australia, lying within the southern Northern Territory. Deposition of locally up to about six km of marine and non-marine sedimentary rocks took place from the Neoproterozoic to the late Paleozoic (ca. 850-340 Ma). Along with other nearby sedimentary basins of similar age (Amadeus Basin, Georgina Basin, Officer Basin), the Ngalia Basin is believed to have once been part of the hypothetical Centralian Superbasin, that was fragmented during episodes of tectonic activity.

== See also ==
- Alice Springs Orogeny
