= Petermann Orogeny =

Neoproterozoic mountain building event

The Petermann Orogeny was an Australian intracontinental event that affected basement rocks of the northern Musgrave Province and Ediacaran (Proterozoic) sediments of the (now) southern Amadeus Basin between 630-520 Ma. The remains are seen today in the Petermann Ranges.

Prior to the Petermann Orogeny, which resulted in exhumation of the Musgrave Block, the Amadeus Basin was contiguous with the Officer Basin in South Australia.

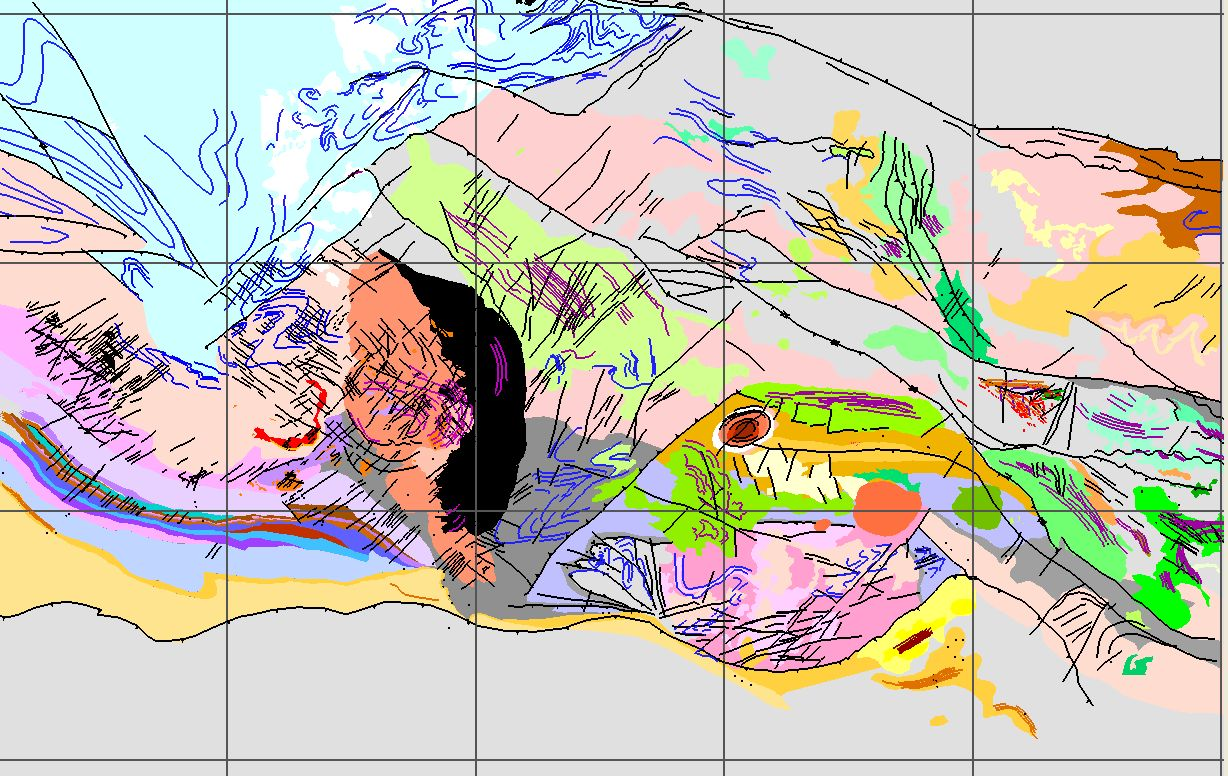
Geological interpretation of the West Musgrave Block, Western Australia. 50x50km grid for scale.

The extent and effect of the Petermann Orogen appears to be relatively confined, occurring most pervasively within the central northern-Musgrave Block. Here, older Musgravian (~1200-1150 Ma) fabrics are partially to completely overprinted by sub-eclogite-facies mineral assemblages (11-12 kbar at 650 °C).

The Woodroofe Thrust, Davenport Shear Zone and Mann Fault accommodated much of the 30–40 km exhumation. Exhumation of the Musgrave Block (and overlying sediments) resulted in successive unroofing and deposition of rock types such as arkose and conglomerate in localised sedimentary basins that now outcrop as Uluru and Kata Tjuta respectively. Beyond this region of intense Petermann-aged activity, deformation related to the Petermann Orogen is less pervasive and ductile.

Sedimentation associated with the Petermann Orogeny is responsible for the deposition of the Georgina Basin, Officer Basin, Ngalia Basin and Amadeus Basin sediments in the Cambrian. Sediments are a mixture of fluvial conglomerates, sandstones, and siltstones.

Several pull-apart structural grabens formed at flexures in the orogenic belt, forming the Levenger and Moorilyanna Grabens.

== Dynamics ==
The Petermann Orogeny is dominated by south-over-north movement on several large, anastomosing curved thrust faults. The prime thrust fault is the Woodroffe Thrust, which is a laminated pseudotachlyte-schist zone up to 300 metres thick. This has accommodated up to 42 kilometres of vertical movement at an angle of about 15 to 20 degrees.

The structure of the Petermann Orogen within the Musgrave Block is considered to be a flower-structure, which is a set of vertically arcuate thrust faults which dip toward each other and accommodate vertical movement by essentially squeezing the central block up and out.

Several northeast trending discontinuities including the Mundrabilla lineament divide the Petermann orogeny, with extensive vertical offsets across them, usually west-side-up, though the timing of this event is unknown.

=== Deformations ===
Six deformations are known (to be completed)

- Folds of D1, D2 and D3 rare; D4 isoclinal upright, and D5 and D6 restricted to cleavage formation or small scale interference folds.
- Megascale Z folding of unknown provenance correlates with NE trending Mundrabilla Lineament parallel structures, and is probably D2 or D3.

=== Foliations ===
Foliations associated with the Petermann Orogeny are typically steeply to gently south-dipping and subparallel to the thrust faults upon which they were developed.

S regionally pervasive stretching lineation is potentially associated with some of these faults, especially in the deeper areas of the crust which have been exhumed, because these were within the temperature and pressure conditions for brittle-ductile and ductile deformation.

== Tectonics ==
The tectonics of the Petermann Orogeny are extremely unusual, as it occurred in an intraplate setting in the centre of the Australian continental block.

Several theories about the causes and dynamics of the orogen are currently under investigation, including;

=== Transpression ===
The Transpression model (by SRK Ltd) considers the Petermann Orogen to be caused by transpressional strike-slip along a series of anastomosing crustal-scale strike-slip thrusts which included movements during the pan-African orogenies and tectonic events of the Cambrian-Ordovician.

The theory states that the degree of extreme uplift experienced in the Petermann Orogeny, specifically the ~42 km of uplift along the Woodroffe Thrust, occurred as a consequence of a crustal scale detachment surface forming a 'basement pop-up' as rock was thrust laterally along the detachment.

Problems with this model include lack of geochronology, and general lack of kinematics directly linked to transpression.

The unusual geometry of this east-west tending orogenic belt suggests that during the formation of the supercontinent Gondwana 550 million years ago, India collided with Western Australia from the northwest, rather than from the west, with deformation accommodated along a zone of crustal weakness and pre-existing fault lines.

=== Intraplate thermal depression-rebound ===
Another theory for the causes of the deep and extremely rapid exhumation of the Petermann Orogen is that it is due to isostatic instabilities caused by thermal events in the deep crust, causing accumulated stress to be released by violent thermal rebound (Sandiford, et al. 2001). This is envisaged as a kind of feedback loop between sedimentation and isostatic orogenic events. However, some authors (Camacho et al.) have called this into question with isotopic models.

=== Gravity anomaly ===
The dramatic north-south difference in gravity across the Woodroffe Thrust-Mann Fault Zone, regarded as the largest continental gravity gradient in the world, is attributed to an upthrust of dense mantle material 30 km closer to the present land surface.

== Economic Geology ==
The Petermann Orogeny exposes deep crustal roots of the previous Musgrave Orogen and likely parts of several poorly exposed Proterozoic orogenic belts and igneous provinces. As such, the rocks of the Petermann Orogen are considered prospective territory for mineral exploration.

The history of mineral exploration in the Petermann Orogen extends back to the last half of the 19th century, with a series of prospectors and exploring pioneers transiting the area. Most famously was Lewis Lasseter, who allegedly found Lasseter's Reef, a near-mythical gold lode of such richness and scale that it has fired imaginations for over a century, but remains undiscovered.

In the mid and late 20th century, government missionaries brought to the indigenous Aboriginal people of the area European law, European culture and the concept of salaried work, previously unknown to the hunter-gatherer inhabitants. In order to provide work, subsidised exploration was undertaken by the Western Mining Corporation, resulting in the discovery of podiform copper at Warburton Range, and eventually the Wingelinna nickel laterite resource.

The advent of the Mabo Decision and land rights movements has seen aboriginal land rights improved, with the result that they now control access to land and exploration tenements. This has created uncertainty about tenure and land access for mineral exploration.

There are three main known forms of mineralisation in the Petermann Orogen;

- Magmatic Ni-Cu-PGE at the undeveloped Nebo-Babel Deposit, found by Western Mining Corporation, and now owned by BHP.
- Podiform copper hosted in sheared basalts in the Warburton Ranges, near Warburton, Western Australia, worked in the 1960s and 1970s.
- Laterite nickel, primarily at Wingellina.

Exploration for Olympic Dam mine lookalikes and for magmatic nickel copper mineralisation is continuing.

== In popular culture ==
There are only one or two geology oriented documentaries that trace Uluru and Kata Tjuta's origins with the Australian Petermann Ranges. The 2012 documentary Australia: The Time Traveller's Guide is possibly the first to make the connection with reasonable clarity.

== See also ==
- Geology of Australia
- Eclogite
- Granulite
- Thrust fault
- Laterite
- Ore genesis
