= Georgina Basin =

Sedimentary basin in Australia

Coordinates: 20°00′S 136°00′E

The Georgina Basin is a large (c. 330,000 km^{2}) intracratonic sedimentary basin in central and northern Australia, lying mostly within the Northern Territory and partly within Queensland. It is named after the Georgina River which drains part of the basin. Deposition of locally up to c. 4 km of marine and non-marine sedimentary rocks took place from the Neoproterozoic to the late Paleozoic (c. 850-350 Ma). Along with other nearby sedimentary basins of similar age (Amadeus Basin, Officer Basin), the Georgina Basin is believed to have once been part of the hypothetical Centralian Superbasin, that was fragmented during episodes of tectonic activity. The best known unit, the Cravens Peak Beds limestone, records a highly endemic array of Early Devonian fishes. This collection of fossil animals is known as the Wuttagoonaspis fauna, which also extends to the lower part of the Dulcie Sandstone in central Northern Territory.

== See also ==
- Ngalia Basin
- Alice Springs Orogeny
