= Amadeus Basin =

Intracratonic sedimentary province in Australia

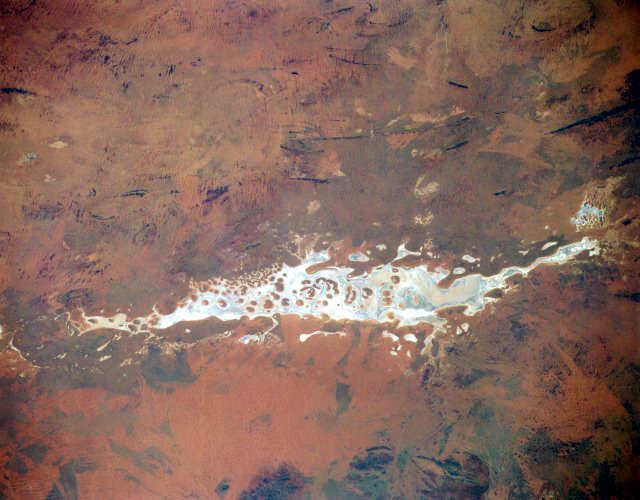
- Lake Amadeus viewed from space (November 1994)

- Location within Australia
- Coordinates: 24°45′00″S 130°55′00″E
- Country: Australia
- States: Northern Territory and Western Australia

Geology
- Orogeny: Petermann Orogeny

The Amadeus Basin is a large (~170,000 km^{2}) intracratonic sedimentary basin in central Australia, lying mostly within the southern Northern Territory, but extending into the state of Western Australia.

== Origins ==
The Amadeus Basin is named after Lake Amadeus which lies within the basin. Local deposition of up to 14 km of marine and non-marine sedimentary rocks took place from the Neoproterozoic to the late Paleozoic.

Along with other nearby sedimentary basins of similar age (Officer Basin, Georgina Basin, Ngalia Basin), the Amadeus Basin is believed to have once been part of the hypothetical Centralian Superbasin.

The basin was locally deformed during the Petermann Orogeny (late Neoproterozoic — Cambrian), and more extensively during the Paleozoic Alice Springs Orogeny, events that fragmented the former Centralian Superbasin.

The basin has been above water for the past 50 million years, as the modern coast of South Australia and Western Australia formed during this time.

== Resources ==
The Amadeus Basin contains the producing Mereenie Oil Field near Kings Canyon and Palm Valley Gas Field near Hermannsburg, which supply most of the energy resources to the Northern Territory.

Most of the gas flows along the Amadeus Gas Pipeline to Darwin, while the oil is pumped to Alice Springs and then transported by truck to Port Bonython for export via tankers, primarily to refineries in Singapore.

== See also ==
- Alice Springs Orogeny
- Georgina Basin
- Ngalia Basin
- Officer Basin
- Uluru (Ayers Rock), situated within the Amadeus Basin
