= Officer Basin =

Sedimentary basin of Western Australia

The Officer Basin is an intracratonic sedimentary basin that covers roughly 320,000 km^{2} along the border between southern and western Australia. Exploration for hydrocarbons in this basin has been sparse, but the geology has been examined for its potential as a hydrocarbon reservoir. This basin's extensive depositional history, with sedimentary thicknesses exceeding 6 km and spanning roughly 350 Ma during the Neoproterozoic, make it an ideal candidate for hydrocarbon production.

Along with other nearby sedimentary basins of similar age (Amadeus Basin, Georgina Basin), the Officer Basin is believed to have once been part of the hypothetical Centralian Superbasin which was fragmented during several episodes of tectonic activity.

== Geologic history ==
Australia is characterized by ancient cratons that record the complex tectonic and geologic history that has occurred over the course of Earth's evolution. The most notable geologic events that resulted in regional rifting of these ancient cratons occurred during the Mesozoic, when sea-floor spreading resulted in rifting between Australia and Antarctica. The breakup of Gondwana resulted in the creation of large onshore and offshore sedimentary basins between the western and eastern Australian cratons. These basins contain much of the country’s hydrocarbon reservoirs. However, the history of the Officer Basin is distinct from the regional tectonic history in that much of its hydrocarbon potential predates the rifting that took place in the Mesozoic.

The Officer Basin refers to sedimentary units that are Neoproterozoic in age, as it is overlain by the younger Gunbarrel Basin, which passes north into the Canning Basin. The depocenter of the Officer Basin was along its northern edge, resulting in an asymmetric accumulation of sediment that gently thins towards the south, with the thickest accumulation in the north. The sediments that constitute the Officer Basin were first deposited upon an unconformable surface over variably metamorphosed basement rocks. This initial deposition is commonly referred to as "Supersequence 1" and contains the probable reservoir Buldya Group, overlain by a seal sequence containing the Hussar, Kanpa, and Steptoe groups. After this depositional sequence, the basin experienced significant folding and erosion during the Areyonga movement, which was followed by subsidence during the Marinoan glacial period. The remaining sediments that overlie Supersequence 1 are from other tectonic events, such as the Petermann/Paterson orogeny, which eventually culminated in an unconformable surface at the Delamerian Orogeny (~490 Ma), marking the end of deposition within the Officer Basin. Extensive tholeiitic lava flows characterize the sequences above the unconformity and mark the basal sequence of the overlying Gunbarrel Basin.

The main sedimentary sequence with the greatest potential for hydrocarbon production and storage is the Buldya Group, which includes coarse siliciclastics overlain by a mixed succession of siltstone, shale, carbonate, and evaporite. The thickest part of this basin sequence is in the north and thins towards the south and west. Regional tectonism during the Neoproterozoic resulted in the formation of several distinct structural zones that intersect the deepest part of the basin. These zones primarily formed as a result of regional compression and have been correlated with the Petermann/Paterson Orogeny. The Officer Basin itself likely functioned as a foreland basin during this orogeny, roughly 550 Ma, and shows preservation of laterally continuous units. Compression from this orogenic event also mobilized salts, resulting in the formation of diapirs in the deeper portions of the basin.

== Stratigraphy - Supersequence 1 ==
=== Browne formation ===
The most notable formations in the Officer basin, in terms of thickness and hydrocarbon potential are the Browne, Hussar and Kanpa. The Browne formation, much like the other formations within the Officer, is deepest in the central portion of the basin, up to several kilometers. This is typical of the Officer basin, as it is deepest in the central portion in the east, and generally shallows westward. The Browne formation constitutes the most identifiable and thickest basal unit of the Officer, and shows remarkable lateral continuity, with limited change in facies across the basin. The lithology of the Browne is largely shale and mudstone, but can vary from dolomite to dolomitic limestone, to thick evaporitic sequences. Based on this, it is likely that the Browne formation's provenance was an intertidal to lagoonal environment. Due to the prevalence of evaporites within the Browne, diapir formation is common and there are many instances of brecciated or contorted strata proximal to diapirs. The Browne has little potential as a hydrocarbon reservoir or source, as it likely reached maximum hydrocarbon production early in the basin’s history. Thus, much of the hydrocarbon production was exhausted during the Neoproterozoic.

=== Hussar formation ===
The Hussar is the next youngest layer above the Browne, albeit a much thinner layer in comparison. The Hussar’s evaporitic content is almost nonexistent; instead this formation is predominantly sandstone and shale, sometimes interbedded with dolomite. The lack of evaporites in the Hussar contrasts sharply with the halite-rich underlying Browne formation. In addition, the basal unit of the Hussar is a very distinct, near 100 m-thick mudstone unit that has been traced in seismic logs, making it a significant marker horizon. Several progradational sequences have been identified within the Hussar, suggesting that its depositional environment was a transitional one, ranging from shelf and shoreline to tidal flat and fluvial.

=== Kanpa formation ===
The Kanpa formation overlies the Hussar, and again the trend of younger formations being less thick than the previous formation continues. The Kanpa formation is unique because it contains a very compact sequence of basaltic flows, called the Kenne Basalt, which has minimal interbedded sediments. Generally, the Kanpa is a mixed siliciclastic-carbonate sequence of interbedded dolomite, with shale, evaporites, and chert. Detrital zircons within the uppermost sandstone layer of the Kanpa were dated using U-Pb dating, and provide a maximum age constraint of 725 Ma. The prevalence of stromatolites within the Kanpa suggest that its depositional setting was a carbonate-dominated shallow marine to tidal flat setting.

=== Steptoe formation ===
The Steptoe formation overlies the Kanpa, and constitutes the final member of Supersequence 1. Its thickness is not well constrained, as it has only been observed in 2 cores to date, but can be up to ~500 m thick. The lithology of the Steptoe is largely sandstone and dolomite, which typically grade into siltstone. The age of this formation is also unconstrained, but it must be younger than 725 Ma, the age of the top of the Kanpa. Due to the lithologic similarities between the Kanpa and the Steptoe, it is likely that their depositional settings were similar, although the Steptoe’s was likely more restricted. More in-shore coastal settings are hypothesized for the depositional environment of the Steptoe.

Summary of the formations within Supersequence 1
Formation name	Age	Lithology	Thickness	Source, seal, reservoir
Browne	~ 840-830 Ma	Mostly shale, thick evaporite sequences, dolomite	~ 2.4-4 km	Source
Hussar	~ 830-790 Ma	Sandstone and shale with interbedded dolomite, minimal evaporites	~ 500-800 m	Source
Kanpa	~ 790-725 Ma	Siliciclastic-carbonate sequence interbedded with dolomite, minor shale, chert and evaporite	~ 250-400 m	N/A
Steptoe	< 725 Ma	Sandstone and massive dolomite, grading into siltstone	~ 100-500 m	Source, reservoir

== Hydrocarbon potential ==
Exploration of this basin in the search of hydrocarbons has been limited, with less than 20 exploration wells being drilled to 2020. Despite this, many of the exploratory wells do show potential for a petroleum reservoir at depth, mostly in the northern portions of the Officer Basin. Exploration wells haven’t been drilled in this area since the late 1990s, but some of the more promising results show that a reservoir could exist within Supersequence 1, specifically within the Kanpa and Hussar formations, which show good to excellent organic richness. Modelling has shown that hydrocarbon production varies greatly across different formations within Supersequence 1. For example, in the ~800 Ma Browne formation, peak hydrocarbon production was reached approximately 750 Ma, but in the younger Kanpa and Hussar formations, peak production shifts to around 300 Ma. This drastic difference in source rock maturity is attributable to the complex tectonic history the Officer Basin has experienced. The seven major tectonic events that the Officer Basin experienced extended the maturation window to up to 1 km in some areas, allowing for production to occur much later in time in younger units compared to older ones.

=== Reservoirs and trapping ===
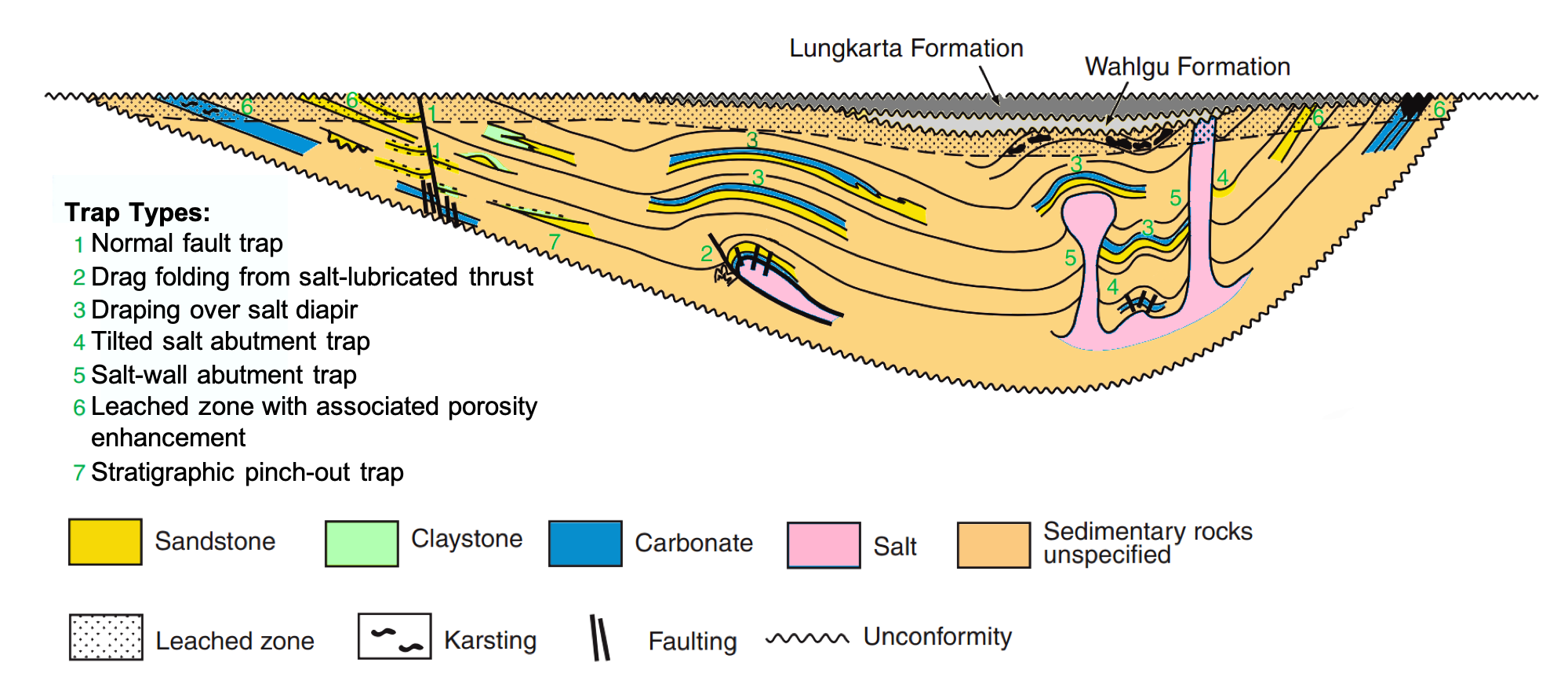
Subsurface structure and various trap types present within Supersequence 1 in the Officer Basin.

Due to the age of this basin and when peak hydrocarbon production was reached, much of the source rocks have been depleted, leaving only reservoir rocks as potential areas of hydrocarbon extraction. Supersequence 1 represents the most prospective portion of the Officer Basin for petroleum exploration, as many of the formations are likely interbedded seals and reservoirs. Within Supersequence 1, the best reservoir rocks are within the Hussar formation, as it is mainly sandstone, and the best seal rocks are in the Browne (below the Hussar) and the Paterson formation (above the Hussar). Reservoir properties are estimated at porosities greater than 20% and permeabilities in the hundreds of millidarcies. Thin, organic rich beds are present within much of Supersequence 1, with varying degrees of maturity. These beds can show excellent hydrocarbon-generating potential and despite their disperse nature, the diverse trapping mechanisms present within Supersequence 1 may allow for significant accumulations of hydrocarbons. The total organic content of these beds is generally within the range of 1 – 3%, but some samples go as high as 21%. To date, there have been 6 oil shows within core samples taken from Supersequence 1. The salt tectonics present within the Browne could allow for a wide range of trapping mechanisms, from anticlinal to fault-bound, due to deformation of overlying strata, making more local hydrocarbon accumulations likely in the deeper, central portion of the basin.

=== Thermal evolution ===
During early basin formation, sediments which constitute the Browne formation reached peak hydrocarbon maturity and thus hydrocarbon generative potential was exhausted during the Neoproterozoic. However, the subsequent deposition of the Hussar, Kanpa and Steptoe formations were not as deep as the Browne, allowing for hydrocarbon generation from these units to extend into the Phanerozoic. After deposition of Supersequence 1, roughly 700 Ma, the basin was affected by at least seven major tectonic events. The effect these events had on hydrocarbon generation and maturation of source rocks is unclear, as the region is grossly understudied. However, a 2000 m thick section of Neoproterozoic rock is currently within the oil generation window within the central portion of the Officer basin. The main type of hydrocarbon production that occurs within the source beds of the Browne, Hussar, Kanpa and Steptoe formations is oil and gas generating type II kerogen. The presence of bitumen and oil within exploratory cores suggests the presence of a petroleum system within Supersequence 1.
