= List of drainage basins of Australia =

A drainage basin is an extent of land where water from rain and melting snow or ice drains downhill into a converging point such as a river mouth, or into a water body such as a lake or the ocean. The drainage basin includes both the streams and rivers that convey the water as well as the land surfaces from which water drains into those channels and is separated from adjacent basins by a drainage divide.

In Australia, major drainage basins are coded by hierarchy within the National Catchment Boundaries (NCB) dataset, with primary drainage basins attributed Level 1 and smaller river catchment subdivisions attributed Level 2. Beyond that, minor river and creek watersheds are ranked by the Pfafstetter Coding System. This article deals with surface water rather than groundwater basins, such as the Great Artesian Basin.

Australia has twelve distinguished NCB Level 1 drainage divisions or thirteen after splitting the South East Coast division at the New South Wales–Victoria border as defined by the Australian Water Resources Assessment 2012, a hydrological survey conducted by the Bureau of Meteorology. Runoff from these divisions generally flows into the Pacific Ocean, the Indian Ocean, the Southern Ocean and Lake Eyre.

Australia's 13 drainage divisions

== List of NCB Level 1 drainage basins ==
Code^{[A]}	Name	Area (km^{2})	Average rainfall (mm) ^{[B]}	Accessible surface storage capacity (GL)	Major rivers	Drains to	Notes
NEC	North East Coast (Queensland)	451,000	827	9,771	Burdekin River, Brisbane River, Fitzroy River (Queensland)	Coral Sea (Pacific Ocean)	
SEN	South East Coast (NSW)	129,500	995	4,056	Manning River, Karuah River, Hunter River, Hawkesbury River	Tasman Sea (Pacific Ocean)	
SEV	South East Coast (Victoria)	134,600	734	7,570	Thomson River (VIC), Macalister River, Snowy River, Yarra River, Glenelg River	Southern Ocean, Bass Strait	
TAS	Tasmania	68,000	1,398	22,041	River Derwent, Gordon River, Huon River, South Esk River	Southern Ocean, Bass Strait, Tasman Sea (Pacific Ocean)	Much of the storage capacity is used for hydroelectricity
MDB	Murray-Darling Basin	1,061,000	458	25,320	Murray River, Darling River, Murrumbidgee River, Lachlan River	Southern Ocean	
SAG	South Australian Gulf	117,700	306	197	River Torrens, Onkaparinga River, Gawler River, Broughton River	Great Australian Bight (Southern Ocean)	
SWP	South Western Plateau	1,093,000	232	No data		Great Australian Bight (Southern Ocean)	Driest region in Australia with no major storage
SWC	South West Coast	326,000	439	959	Avon River, Blackwood River	Indian Ocean, Great Australian Bight (Southern Ocean)	
PG	Pilbara-Gascoyne	478,000	259	63	Greenough River, Murchison River	Indian Ocean	
NWP	North Western Plateau	716,000	316	No data	De Grey River	Indian Ocean	No major storage
TTS	Tanami-Timor Sea Coast	1,162,000	656	10,747	Ord River, Alligator Rivers, Daly River, Katherine River, Fitzroy River	Timor Sea (Indian Ocean)	
LEB	Lake Eyre Basin	1,281,000	242	No data	Georgina River, Diamantina River, Thomson River (QLD), Barcoo River, Cooper Creek	Lake Eyre	Only major surface Endorheic basin^{[C]}
CC	Carpentaria Coast ^{[D]}	647,000	744	99	Mitchell River, Flinders River, Gilbert River, Leichhardt River	Gulf of Carpentaria, Arafura Sea	

- A New drainage basin codes assigned by the Bureau of Meteorology in 2010. Previous codes were labelled using Roman Numerals. See for details.
- B Long term average from July 1911 to June 2010
- C The obsolete Australia River Basins 1997 survey listed the Bulloo-Bancannia drainage basin as a separate division, but has now been combined with the Lake Eyre Basin.
- D Known in Queensland as Gulf Basin

== See also ==
- List of reservoirs and dams in Australia
- List of rivers of Australia
- Geography of Australia
- Climate change in Australia
- Drought in Australia
- Great Artesian Basin
