= South West drainage division =

Drainage division in Western Australia

The south-west corner drainage region of Western Australia is one of only two temperate and relatively fertile parts of mainland Australia. It covers about 140,000 square kilometres (54,000 sq mi), or a little less than 2% of the continent. For comparison, this is about the same size as North Carolina or a little larger than England.

The landscape is generally flat and sandy but there are several major features, in particular the Stirling Range near Albany, which reaches 1,096 metres (3,596 ft) at its highest point, and the Darling Scarp.

The climate is temperate Mediterranean. Summers are warm to hot and dry, winters are cool and wet. Mountains near the coast concentrate rainfall in that area, with parts of the extreme south-western corner receiving as much as 1,400 mm (55 in) per year. Away from the coast, however, precipitation drops rapidly, with inland areas averaging about 250 mm (10 in) per year.

Other Western Australian drainage divisions include:

- Pilbara freshwater ecoregion
- Timor Sea drainage division in the Kimberley and the Northern Territory Top End.

Other Australian drainage divisions include:

- Gulf of Carpentaria
- Australian north-east coast drainage division
- Australian south-east coast drainage division
- Murray–Darling basin
- South Australian gulf drainage division
- Lake Eyre basin
- Western Plateau

== See also ==
- List of watercourses in Western Australia
- List of rivers of Australia
