= Tony Jose =

Australian cricketer

Anthony Jose
Personal information
- Full name: Anthony Douglas Jose
- Born: 17 February 1929; Adelaide, South Australia
- Died: 3 February 1972 (aged 42); Los Angeles, California
- Batting: Right-handed
- Bowling: Right-arm fast-medium
- Role: Bowler

Domestic team information
- Years: Team
- 1947/48: South Australia
- 1951–52: Kent

Career statistics
| Competition | First-class |
|---|---|
| Matches | 29 |
| Runs scored | 269 |
| Batting average | 7.47 |
| 100s/50s | 0/0 |
| Top score | 39 |
| Balls bowled | – |
| Wickets | 75 |
| Bowling average | 30.57 |
| 5 wickets in innings | 1 |
| 10 wickets in match | 0 |
| Best bowling | 6/45 |
| Catches/stumpings | 11/– |
- Source: Cricinfo, 11 July 2023

Anthony Douglas Jose (17 February 1929 – 3 February 1972), known as Tony Jose, was an Australian cricketer who played first-class cricket for South Australia, Kent, Oxford University, and Free Foresters between 1948 and 1953.

The second son of Gilbert Jose, who also played first-class cricket for South Australia, and Hazel (née Brook), who died in 1930, Jose was born in Adelaide, South Australia, and attended Adelaide's St Peter's College, where he was dux in 1945 and captain in 1946.

Accepted into the University of Adelaide in 1946 to study medicine, Jose was awarded a Rhodes Scholarship in 1948, heading to Oxford University, where he gained a doctorate.

== Sporting career ==
Jose excelled in a range of sports from an early age, holding the state junior record for long jump and triple jump, representing the South Australian junior team in rugby union, and was a leading junior hurdler.

He made his senior district cricket debut for Adelaide University Cricket Club in November 1947 and his debut for South Australia came two months later, aged 18, on 9 January 1948 against New South Wales at the Sydney Cricket Ground, opening the bowling and taking 2/76 and 2/33, including the wickets of Test players Arthur Morris and Sid Barnes.

Jose was praised for his debut performance, with onlookers noting that he gave "the ball a disconcertedly late swing" and the Sydney Daily Telegraph thought him to be a Test possibility.

However, Jose only played twice more for South Australia before moving to England to study at Oxford. While there, Jose played for the university, being awarded blues in 1950 and 1951. as well as occasionally for Kent in 1951 and 1952 and Free Foresters in 1953.

Jose worked as a cardiologist in Sydney and Los Angeles, where he committed suicide in 1972, aged 42.

== Family ==
In addition to his father, Jose's grandfather George Jose was Dean of Adelaide, his uncle Sir Ivan Bede Jose was awarded the Military Medal during World War I while another uncle, Wilfred Jose, was killed in the war.

== Sources ==
- Bonnell, M & Sproul, A. (2022) Black Swan Summer: The Improbable Story of Western Australia's first Sheffield Shield, Pitch Publishing: Chichester. ISBN 9781801502054.
- Page, R. (1984) South Australian Cricketers 1877–1984, Association of Cricket Statisticians: Retford, Nottinghamshire.
