= Australian north-east coast drainage division =

Drainage division in Queensland

Drainage divisions of Australia, 2010

The north-east coast drainage division or north-east coast basin is a drainage basin in Queensland, Australia.

== Geography ==
The drainage between the Great Dividing Range and the Pacific Ocean. It lies between Torres Strait and an arbitrary line drawn along the Queensland–New South Wales border. The Gulf of Carpentaria drainage basin is to the north-west, while Lake Eyre Basin and the Murray-Darling Basin are further south-west. The Australian south-east coast drainage division lies to the south of the border with New South Wales and is also to the east of the Great Dividing Range.

The basin covers 450,705 km^{2} across 46 river catchments. It is the seventh largest out of twelve separate drainage divisions covering Mainland Australia. Just under one half of all Australian freshwater species are found in the north–east coast division.

== See also ==
- Southwest corner of Western Australia
- Indian Ocean drainage division: see Pilbara region of Western Australia
- Timor Sea drainage division: see Top End and Kimberley region of Western Australia
- South Australian gulf drainage division
- Western Plateau
