= Australian Encyclopaedia =

Reference work

The Australian Encyclopaedia is an encyclopaedia focused on Australia. In addition to biographies of notable Australians the coverage includes the geology, flora, fauna as well as the history of the continent. It was first published by Angus and Robertson in two volumes, one each in 1925 and 1926. The most recent edition, the sixth, is of eight volumes published in 1996.

== Origins and first publication ==
The Australian Encyclopaedia is a national representation of the defining aspects of Australia. This includes information related to the nation's history, the geography of Australia and information regarding the Aboriginal people. When the encyclopaedia was first established (1925–1926), it consisted of two volumes and was originally published by Angus & Robertson in New South Wales. The second edition, published in 1958, was then extended to 10 volumes. Four years later, the encyclopaedia was under the responsibility of the Grolier Society of Australia. Following this change, the second edition of the encyclopaedia had undergone many reprintings due to minor adjustments up until 1972. Subsequently, the third edition was then published in 1977 and consisted of 6 volumes; the fourth edition, featuring 12 volumes, was published in 1983; the fifth edition with 9 volumes was published in 1988 and the sixth edition consisted of 8 volumes and was published in 1996. The encyclopaedia was sold to the Australian Geographic Society in 1987 prior to the publication of the fifth and sixth edition.

== Arthur Jose ==
Arthur Wilberforce Jose was born in Clifton, England. He was the son of William Wilberforce Jose who was a governor at a university located at the city of Jose's birth, Bristol. Jose's father was also the chairman of the technical education committee for the school board of Bristol. Following Jose's studies at Balliol College, Oxford, his health had begun to worsen. A year later, in 1882, Jose was recovering in Australia. While in Australia, Jose's father was in dire straits financially and had eventually lost his fortune. Following the delivery of this news, Jose turned down a clerical career in Bristol and remained in Australia. Jose tackled many jobs during the beginning of his family's financial loss. This included cutting wood, making bricks, picking apples and tutoring. In 1885, Jose had commenced his career as an assistant master at All Saints' College in Bathurst, New South Wales. After multiple edits and writings of songs and articles, Jose had soon become an extension lecturer at a university and a writer for several verses in 1888. Prior to the allocation of his editor-in-chief role and the publication of the Australian Encyclopaedia, Jose spent many years as a reader for the Angus & Robertson corporation. Despite Jose never practising law, in 1891 he was granted admission to the Bar.

Following the publication of his writing, The Growth of the Empire, in 1897, Jose went on to writing many more published articles, books and chapters, he acquired the role of professor in modern history and English in Aligarh at the Mohammedan Anglo-Oriental College and a lecturer in England. In 1904, Jose had arrived back in Sydney as a Times correspondent. The first edition of the Australian Encyclopaedia was disrupted due to the war in 1914, therefore delaying its publication. Jose was employed by George Robertson for the encyclopaedia full-time and was named editor-in-chief of the Australian Encyclopaedia a year later when the first volume was titled The Illustrated Australian Encyclopaedia. Jose was collaborating with entomologist, Herbert James Carter, with the editing of Australian Encyclopaedia. Carter's responsibilities were centred around the scientific aspects of the encyclopaedia, leaving the remaining work to be edited by Jose. The second volume of the Australian Encyclopaedia had not been edited yet when Jose left the publishing company, Angus & Robertson, in 1925.

== Angus & Robertson ==
One of the founders of Angus & Robertson, David Mackenzie Angus (1855–1901), had originally ventured into Australian literature when he had opened his Sydney bookstore in 1884. Two years later, Angus partnered with George Robertson and another two years later, their establishment had commenced publishing. The incorporation of publishing had resulted in profitable success and a larger variety of literary products in several areas.

Angus & Robertson had commenced their work on the Australian Encyclopaedia in 1912. The First World War had then interrupted the progression of the encyclopaedia. As a result of the war, the operation behind the Australian Encyclopaedia was put on hold. In 1925, the first volume of the encyclopaedia had been published and a year later, the second volume was published.

== Representation and Structure: From Edition I to Edition II ==
Within all the editions of the Australian Encyclopaedia, the encyclopaedia explicitly represents Australian life with the consideration of the significant number of investigations and research behind Australia and the people of Australia from past decades. Over 1800 biographical accounts of Australian public figures are covered within the encyclopaedia, as well as the detailed analysis of Australia's geography, mineral assets and Australian animal and plant life. The first edition of the Australian Encyclopaedia had commenced in 1912 and was published over a decade later. The second edition had significantly enlarged, volume wise, in order to adequately measure up to the developing subject matter. The editor-in-chief at the time, Alexander (Alec) Hugh Chisholm, provides an explanation for the expansion of the Australian Encyclopaedia:

Science and industry have made remarkable progress since World War I and Australia has shared fully in this advancement. Industry throughout the Commonwealth was stimulated by the impact of World War II and the impetus has since been continued. Moreover, knowledge has broadened considerably in zoology, botany and kindred subjects–so much so, indeed, that most of the entries in the earlier Encyclopaedia on such subjects as mammals, birds, fishes, insects and plants, though authoritative in their period, have had to be written anew.

That is, the extension is justified by the progress and advancements made within industries and science since the first World War. Given that Australia shares and contributes towards this advancement, it is appropriate to formally acknowledge this within the Australian Encyclopaedia. The first edition of the Australian Encyclopaedia consisted of 2 volumes.

The Australian Encyclopaedia was then expanded in 1958, with the second edition featuring an additional 8 volumes. This 10 volume edition explores 6,200 subjects which are supported by over 2,000 illustrations and are all discussed with within 4,500,000 words. Within the encyclopaedia, there are 2,200 biographies, 1,400 entries regarding geography and the flora and fauna aspect of the encyclopaedia are covered by 1,600 articles. Despite the encyclopaedia claiming to revolve around the nation of Australia as a continent, it also includes New Zealand and the Australian territories. The majority of the articles featured in the second edition of the Australian Encyclopaedia are dedicated to history, geography and natural science. Furthermore, unlike the alphabetising of the general headings in the first edition of the Australian Encyclopaedia, the second edition alphabetises its featured articles under specific headings.

Deputy Principal Librarian of the State Library of New South Wales, Gordon Dalyell Richardson, critically analyses the Australian Encyclopaedia within his review by exploring the structure, interpretations, and content. Richardson (1959) discusses the main standards of work from a librarian's perspective, that being authenticity, usage, and up-to-datedness. Following Richardson's (1959) explanation of authenticity, the second edition of the Australian Encyclopaedia was shown to exhibit multiple errors, thus threatening its quality and validity. Richardson (1959) discusses some examples such as the libraries articles. For example, the second edition claims that R. C. Walker was succeeded as New South Wales' Principal Librarian by Anderson following Walker's death. This appears to be incorrect as the position was succeeded by Anderson four years prior to Walker's death. The articles on libraries in the second edition of the Australian Encyclopaedia also implies that J. K. Moir of Melbourne commenced transferring his work to "the Public Library of that city". This is an error as the collection of Moir had begun to be transferred to the Public Library of Victoria. In addition to the errors within the second edition, there was information that was moderated despite the expansion of the volumes within the new edition of the Australian Encyclopaedia. The first edition accounted for the Wrecks and Shipping Disasters in the form of a list. This list was reviewed and altered for the second edition. The second edition exhibited the list alphabetically based on the ship's titles. This list is located independently before the index in volume 10 and is less broad and more restricted than the portrayal in the first edition.

== History ==
The encyclopaedia was initiated in 1912 as a historical and biographical record under the directorship of Charles H. Bertie, municipal librarian of Sydney. The outbreak of World War I in 1914 temporarily halted its progress.

In 1917, work resumed and it was decided that the book should also include scientific subjects. Herbert J. Carter, later to be president of the Linnean Society of New South Wales (1925–26) recruited other Australian scientists to work on the encyclopaedia. Their contributions were, in many instances, the first summaries of scientific knowledge published in a general reference work in Australia. In 1920 Captain Arthur Jose was released from the Australian Navy and became the general editor. He found that, since significant time had elapsed since the project started and newer sources of information were available, it had become necessary to re-write much of the historical and biographical information.

Alexander Hugh Chisholm was editor-in-chief of the second edition, published in 1958. It received glowing reviews from newspapers around the nation.

The third edition was edited by Bruce W. Pratt.

Richard Appleton became editor-in-chief in 1977 and oversaw the fourth and fifth editions.

Tony Macdougall was editor-in-chief of the sixth edition.

== Editions ==
- 1st Edition, 1925–26, two volumes
- 2nd Edition, 1958, ten volumes (several reprintings)
- 3rd Edition, 1977, six volumes
- 4th Edition, 1983, twelve volumes
- 5th Edition, 1988, nine volumes
- 6th Edition, 1996, eight volumes

The 3rd and 4th editions were published by the Grolier Society of Australia. The 5th and 6th editions were published by Australian Geographic.
