= Arthur Jose =

English-Australian historian (1863–1934)

Arthur Wilberforce Jose (4 September 1863 – 22 January 1934) was an English-Australian historian and editor of the Australian Encyclopaedia.

Jose was born at Bristol, South West England, eldest son of William Wilberforce Jose, and his wife Sarah Maria, née Woodward. W. W. Jose was chairman of Bristol School Board's technical education committee and a governor of University College, Bristol. Arthur Jose was educated at Clifton College. His brother was George Jose.

In 1888, under the pseudonym of "Ishmael Dare", Jose published a volume of poems, Sun and Cloud on River and Sea, a collection of musical verses. In 1920 he commenced writing the volume on the Royal Australian Navy in the Official History of Australia in the War of 1914-1918 which appeared in 1928.

He often wrote articles under a pseudonym, of which thirteen have been identified. Some names he used when writing for particular publications, or on certain subjects. For instance, "Melanesia" was used when writing for The Sydney Morning Herald and "Turbine" when writing on national defence. There may be other pseudonyms as yet unidentified.

Jose died at Brisbane on 22 January 1934 of peritonitis and was buried in Toowong Cemetery, with Anglican rites.

He was married with a son.
