= South Australian gulf drainage division =

Drainage division in South Australia

Coordinates: 32°24′11″S 137°45′10″E

The South Australian gulf drainage division is the area surrounding the Gulf St Vincent and Spencer Gulf and a sliver of country to the immediate north. It includes 75,000 square kilometres of mostly moderately flat territory, broken only by the Mount Lofty Ranges which reach 932 metres at their highest point. It is bounded by the Murray-Darling Basin to the east, the Lake Eyre Basin to the north, and the Western Plateau to the west.

While waters falling to the north and west flow inland and dissipate into the sands and ephemeral salt lakes of the central Australian deserts, waters falling on the South Australian gulf drainage division flow south to the sea. Rainfall over the area varies between 200 and 750 mm (8 to 30 inches) per year, tends to be concentrated on the highest and most southerly districts, and primarily occurs in winter.

There are no permanent fresh water lakes in the region and the rivers are short. The best-known of them is the River Torrens, which flows through the capital of South Australia, Adelaide.

== See also ==
- Australian south-west coast drainage division
- Australian north-east coast drainage division
- Australian south-east coast drainage division
