= Gilbert Jose =

Australian cricketer

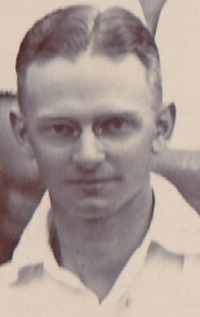
- Jose in 1922

Personal information
- Full name: Gilbert Edgar Jose
- Born: 1 November 1898; Taizhou, Zhejiang, China
- Died: 27 March 1942 (aged 43); Changi Prison, Singapore
- Batting: Right-handed
- Relatives: Tony Jose (son); George Jose (father); Ivan Bede Jose (brother)

Domestic team information
- Years: Team
- 1918/19–1920/21: South Australia

Career statistics
| Competition | First-class |
|---|---|
| Matches | 2 |
| Runs scored | 18 |
| Batting average | 4.50 |
| 100s/50s | 0/0 |
| Top score | 16 |
| Balls bowled | 18 |
| Wickets | 0 |
| Bowling average | – |
| 5 wickets in innings | – |
| 10 wickets in match | – |
| Best bowling | – |
| Catches/stumpings | 0/– |
- Source: CricketArchive, 14 December 2012

Gilbert Edgar Jose (1 November 1898 – 27 March 1942) was an Australian surgeon and first-class cricketer who played for South Australia. He died whilst a prisoner of war in Changi Prison during World War II.

== Early life ==
Jose was born in Taizhou, China, where his father, George Jose, worked as a CMS missionary.

Back in Australia, Jose attended St Peter's College in Adelaide.

== Cricket career ==
Jose made his first-class debut for South Australia in the 1918/19 season, against Victoria at the Melbourne Cricket Ground. He scored a pair, run out without scoring in the first innings and bowled for 0 by Ted McDonald in his second innings. Although he only batted in the lower order, Jose wasn't called on to bowl in the match.

His second first-class appearance came in 1920/21, at the Adelaide Oval, against the touring Marylebone Cricket Club. He came in at six in the batting order and scored 16 in his first innings. Promoted up the order to five in the second innings, Jose scored just two.

== Military service ==
Jose, a Fellow of the Royal Australasian College of Surgeons, served with the Australian Army Medical Corps in World War II. A Major, he was assigned to the 10th Australian General Hospital and was taken prisoner by the Japanese. He was kept as a prisoner of war in Changi, Singapore and died from dysentery on 27 March 1942.

== Family ==
He had two brothers, Ivan Bede Jose and Wilfrid (commonly misspelled Wilfred) Oswald Jose, who both served in the first World War. Ivan was awarded a Military Cross and was later the Chief Surgeon at the Royal Adelaide Hospital. Wilfrid was killed in action in Noreuil, France in April 1917.

His son, Tony Jose, was also a first-class cricketer.
