= Mainland Australia =

Main landmass of the Australian continent

- The Australian mainland, photographed by Himawari 8 in 2022
- Interactive map of Mainland Australia
- Etymology: Latin Terra Australis, 'Southern Land'

Geography
- Location: Between the Indian, Pacific and Southern Oceans
- Coordinates: 27°S 133°E
- Archipelago: Australasia
- Adjacent to: Indian Ocean (west); Great Australian Bight (southwest); Southern Ocean (south); Bass Strait (southeast); Tasman Sea (southeast); Pacific Ocean (east); Coral Sea (east); Torres Strait (northeast); Gulf of Carpentaria (north); Arafura Sea (north); Timor Sea (northwest)
- Area: 7,591,608 km^{2} (2,931,136 sq mi)
- Area rank: 4th-largest continental landmass
- Highest elevation: 2,228 m (7310 ft)
- Highest point: Mount Kosciuszko

Administration
- Australia
- States and territories: Australian Capital Territory; Jervis Bay Territory; New South Wales; Northern Territory; Queensland; South Australia; Victoria; Western Australia
- Largest settlement: Greater Sydney

Demographics
- Demonym: Mainlander, Mainsplainer (called in Tasmania)
- Population: 25,895,442
- Population rank: 3rd most populous continental landmass; if considered an island, it would be 8th most populous island
- Languages: English (Australian English, Australian Aboriginal English); Australian Aboriginal languages; Auslan; Mandarin; Arabic; Cantonese; Vietnamese
- Ethnic groups: European (White) Australians (69%); Aboriginal Australians (3%); Asian Australians (17%); North African and Middle Eastern Australians (3%)

Additional information
- Time zone: Australian Western Standard Time (UTC+8) Australian Central Standard Time (UTC+09:30) Australian Eastern Standard Time (UTC+10)
  - Summer (DST): Australian Central Daylight Saving Time (UTC+10:30) Australian Eastern Daylight Saving Time (UTC+11)

Mainland Australia is the main landmass of the Australian continent, excluding the Aru Islands, New Guinea, Tasmania, and other Australian offshore islands. The landmass also constitutes the mainland of the territory governed by the Commonwealth of Australia, and the term, along with continental Australia, can be used in a geographic sense to exclude surrounding continental islands and external territories. Generally, the term is applied to the states of New South Wales, (Note: Parts of New South Wales, such as Lord Howe Island, are part of the mostly submerged continent of Zealandia.) Queensland, South Australia, Victoria, and Western Australia, as well as the Australian Capital Territory, Jervis Bay Territory, and Northern Territory.

The term is typically used when referring to the relationship between Tasmania and the other Australian states, in that people not from Tasmania are referred to as mainlanders. Tasmania has been omitted on a number of occasions from maps of Australia, reinforcing the divide between Tasmania and the mainland. The 1982 Commonwealth Games in Brisbane left Tasmania off the map of Australia during the opening ceremony, as did the designs of the Australian Swim Team uniform for the 2014 Commonwealth Games in Glasgow.

The land mass covers 7,591,608 km^{2} (2,931,136 sq mi), about 98.7% of the area of the country of Australia and 1.5% of Earth's surface. It is sometimes described as an island, in which case it would be the largest island by area–more than three times the size of Greenland. Its population is about 25.9 million, 98% of Australia's total population; its population is similar to that of Mindanao or Taiwan. Mainland Australia has a variety of climatic regions, ranging from tropical rainforests and deserts to cool temperature rainforests to snow-covered mountains. It is in these mainland regions that much of Australia's native flora and fauna can be found.

== History ==
Early in the Cretaceous period, 130 million years ago, Australia (and Antarctica) separated from a supercontinent known as Gondwana. Antarctica's separation from Australia began roughly 85 million years ago, at a rate of a few millimetres per year. It took over 30 million years (53 million years ago), toward the end of the Palaeocene epoch, for Australia to fully separate from Antarctica and set course for where we see the two continents today.

During the last ice-age around 35,000 years ago, sea levels (around Australia) dropped by 120 metres (390 ft), developing a continuous stretch of land between what is now Papua New Guinea, Australia and Tasmania. Over the next 6,000 years the ice gradually melted, increasing sea-levels, cutting off Papua New Guinea and Tasmania from mainland Australia.

=== Prehistory ===
It has been estimated that Australian Aborigines occupied mainland Australia up to 50,000 to 60,000 years ago, well before the last ice-age. Although an exact figure has not been decided on, numerous DNA studies all confirm that Aboriginal Australians are one of the oldest living populations in the world outside of Africa. Prior to the arrival of Europeans on the Australian mainland in the late 18th century, over 500 different clan groups (nations) each with unique cultures, beliefs and languages inhabited territories on the mainland. Currently, Indigenous people living on the mainland make up 2.4% of the total Australian population, encompassing over 250 language groups.

=== European colonization ===
The first documented encounter of the Australian mainland was by Willem Janszoon in 1606, as he sailed around Australia's north coast arriving in present-day Cape York, Queensland. These explorations led way to the term 'Terra Australis', Latin for South Land, which was hypothesised on the notion there must be land in the Southern Hemisphere to balance the land mass in the Northern Hemisphere. This encounter led several other Dutch, Spanish, Portuguese and British journeyings to Terra Australis throughout the 17th and 18th century, progressively mapping what we now know to be as (mainland) Australia. The most famous and well documented expedition of Australia occurred 164 years after Janszoon's journey, through British navigator and explorer James Cook. He documented the first interaction of the Eastern Australian coastline, and on 23 April 1770, Cook made the first recorded observation of Indigenous Australians at nowadays Brush Island. This journey, coupled with numerous other reports, ultimately led the British to establish a penal colony in Australia, firstly at Botany Bay.

== Geography ==
Physical map of Australia

The Australian mainland's geology and climate is one of its defining features. Despite being surrounded by ocean, approximately 20% of the Australian mainland is classified as desert. This is due to the extremely variable rain patterns across the mainland. Toward the barren centre of the mainland, the rainfall pattern is concentric and sparse, whereas there is higher intensity rainfall toward the mainland's tropics and coastal areas. Australia lies on the middle of the Indo-Australian tectonic plate and as a result is not influenced by any severe tectonic activity. Over millions of years, the shifting of these tectonic plates has seen the Australian mainland undergo many physical changes. Mountain ranges and seas have come and gone, and the forces of weathering and erosion have formed much of the mainland's current topography. These physical changes developed four primary landform divisions spread throughout the mainland states and territories; the Coastal Plains, the Eastern and Southern highlands, the Central Lowlands (and Deserts) and the Western and Northern Plateaus (and Basins).

=== Coastal Plains ===
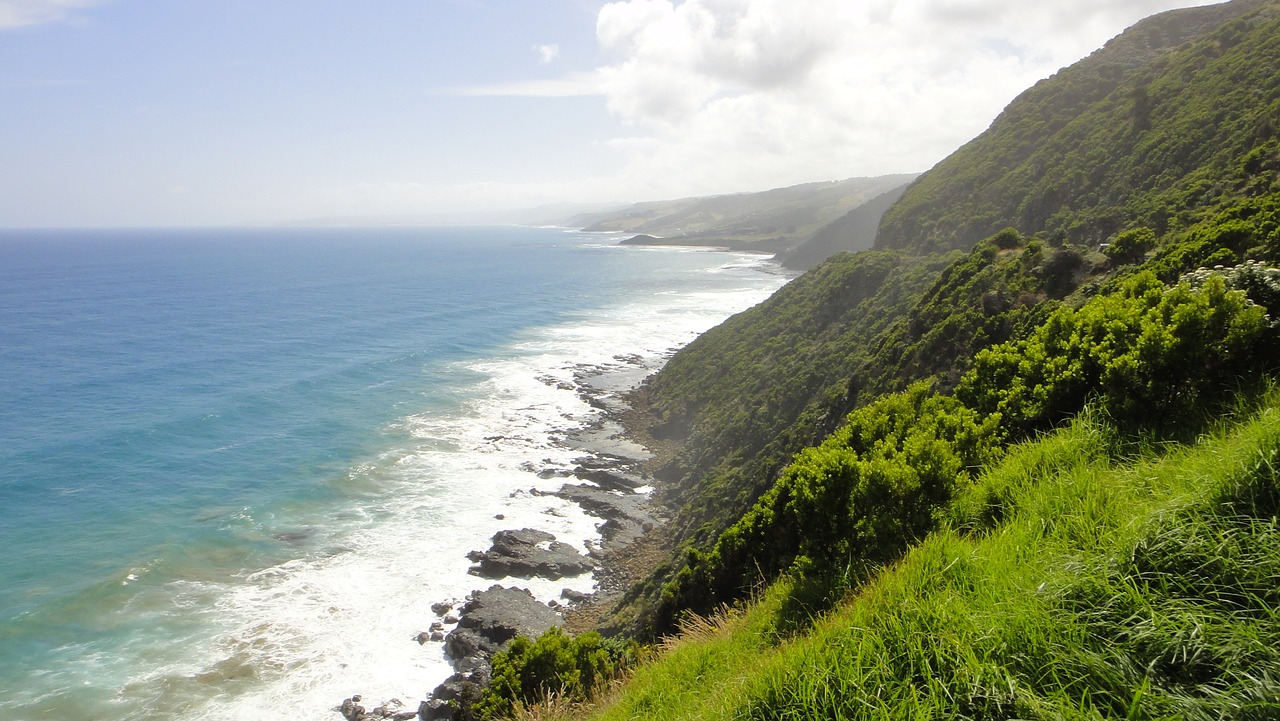
Eastern coast of Australia

Along the Eastern seaboard of the mainland are the Coastal Plains; a narrow strip of land along the East coast of Australia from Queensland to Victoria. This division is host to some of the mainland's major cities, namely, Brisbane, Sydney and Melbourne, due to its hospitable conditions. Some sources refer to the Coastal Plains as the entire coastline of the mainland, outspreading beyond the East Coast.

=== Eastern Highlands ===
Approximately 100 km (62 mi) inland, the Eastern Highlands (including the Great Dividing Range) cover almost 10% of the mainland. Incorporating several mountain ranges which extend 3,700 km (2,300 mi) the Highlands run parallel to the east coast of the mainland; covering Queensland, New South Wales, the Australian Capital Territory and Victoria. The highlands were formed around 80 million years ago, and are some of the oldest and most prominent in the world. This area is very rugged and primarily consists of a series of tablelands and plateaus. The highlands are much more prominent toward the south east of the mainland and form the Southern Highlands, which are located across (south) New South Wales, the Australian Capital Territory and Victoria. These Southern highlands experience snowfall for more than half the year during the winter due to their higher altitude.

=== Central Lowlands ===
Occupying approximately 25% of the Australian mainland, the Central Lowlands (and Deserts) are low-lying with an average height of under 200 metres (660 ft) above sea level. It is home to the Sturt and Simpson deserts and closer to Central Australia lie some desert mountain ranges (MacDonnell and Musgrave). The Central Lowlands incorporates three primary drainage basins: in the North, the Carpentaria Lowlands, Lake Eyre toward the centre and the Murray-Darling Basin down South. The lowest point on the mainland is found in this division at Lake Eyre, at 50m below sea level.

=== Western Plateau ===
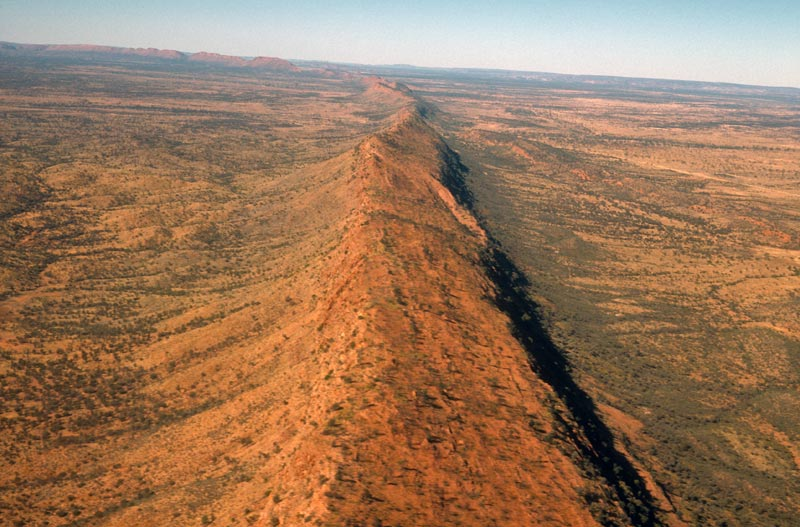
Western Plateau, Northern Territory

Approximately 144 to 65 million years ago (Cretaceous period), there lay a great inland sea, stretching over one quarter of the mainland. The evaporation of this ocean left behind what we now know as the Western Plateau. The Western and Northern Plateaus incorporate nearly all Western Australia and the Northern Territory and parts of South Australia. Over one-third of the mainland, the Plateaus are made of one stable block of igneous and metamorphic rock which is up to 3.6 billion years old. Despite this, the Plateau is a huge area of tablelands, averaging 500m above sea level in some parts. It is home to Uluru, Kata Tjuta, the Finke River, the Victorian Desert, the Great Sandy Desert and the Gibson Desert. Much of the Western Plateau receives minimal rainfall and thus appears red in colour. Conversely, the Northern Plateau experiences heavy rainfall throughout the wet season (November to April), due to its more tropical location compared to the Western Plateau.

== Natural resources ==
Australia's separation from the other continents resulted in a long period of uplift, erosion and thick terrigenous deposition in rift valleys. It was these processes which over millions of years has led to the accumulation of Australia's main known mineral, oil and gas resources. Most of Australia's oil and gas exploration occurs off the mainland. However, on the mainland, the abundance of minerals (and thus metals) has formed the basis of Australia's dependence on mining; exporting much of these natural occurring resources overseas.

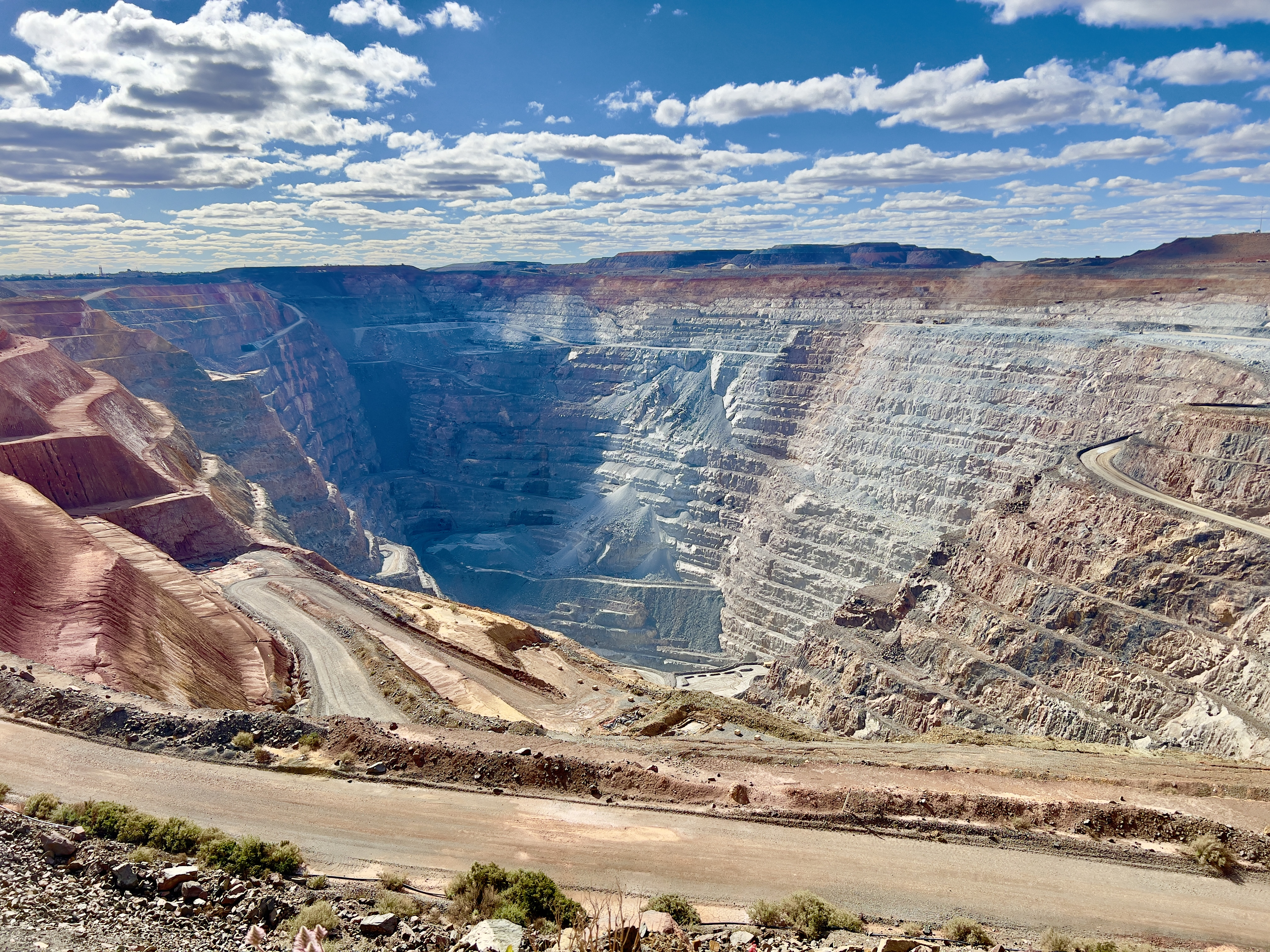
Super Pit gold mine on Kalgoorlie's Golden Mile in Western Australia

=== Mining ===
The Australian mainland is host to some of the world's largest open-cut and underground mines. Across the mainland states (besides the ACT), there are over 350 operating mines, producing 19 useful rocks and minerals. These mines allow Australia to be one of the world's largest producers of iron ore, coal, bauxite (aluminium ore), manganese, nickel, copper, gold, silver, cobalt, lead, uranium, opal and diamond. Some of the largest mines on the Australian mainland are listed below:

Major mines on the Australian mainland
Mine	Owner	State	Type	Minerals produced	Size
Mount Arthur	BHP	New South Wales	Open cut	Coal Gold	12 km^{2}
Peak Downs	BHP	Queensland	Open cut	Coal	688 km^{2}
Cannington	South32	Queensland	Underground	Silver Lead	5.25 km (multiple tunnels)
Carmichael	Bravus Mining and Resources (Adani)	Queensland	Open cut	Coal	447 km^{2}
Olympic Dam	BHP	South Australia	Underground	Copper Uranium Gold Silver	450 km (multiple tunnels)
Argyle	Rio Tinto	Western Australia	Underground	Diamond	40 km (multiple tunnels)
Boddington	Newmont	Western Australia	Open cut	Gold Copper	212 km^{2}
Fimiston	Kalgoorlie Consolidated Gold Mines	Western Australia	Open cut	Gold	5.25 km^{2} (360m deep)
Roy Hill	Hancock Prospecting	Western Australia	Open cut Underground	Iron ore	4,000 km^{2}
Worsley Alumina	South32	Western Australia	Open cut	Bauxite	5,000 km^{2}
Yandicoogina	Rio Tinto	Western Australia	Open cut	Iron ore	267 km^{2}

=== Renewables ===
The Australian mainland's various geology and climate, has led to the increased utilisation of renewable energy (solar, wind and hydro) over recent decades. In 2021, approximately 28.9% of the mainland's total electricity generation was from renewable energy sources with South Australia at 66.5% renewable energy generation, Victoria at 33.4%, Western Australia at 31.5%, New South Wales at 26.0% and Queensland at 19.6%. The majority of this renewable energy was generated through wind and solar, proportionally contributing 35.9% and 38.3% respectively.

== Politics ==
Australian political decisions are typically deliberated and enacted within the limits of homeland (mainland Australia) soil. Despite Tasmania being one of Australia's six British establishment colonies, Tasmania has often been looked over due to the state's small size and general isolation. This is observed through the states and territories of mainland Australia representing 146 of the 151 members in Parliament.

The 25th of March 2023 New South Wales state election marked the second time in history that the Australian Labor Party gained control of the entirety of Mainland Australia at the federal and mainland state levels simultaneously (leaving Tasmania as the only state with a Liberal government), a feat that had last been achieved in 2007. This would last until 24 August 2024 Northern Territory general election when Labor lost Northern Territory to the Country Liberal Party (CLP) opposition. Losing its first mainland state/Territory level.

The Liberal National opposition have never had this feat (control of the entirety of Mainland Australia at the federal and mainland state levels simultaneously) as of 2024.

=== State formation ===
From 1788 to 1859, Britain established five colonies on the Australian mainland, and one in Tasmania. All six colonies were constitutionally connected to Britain, each with their own parliament and courts, with their respective laws subject to the laws of British Parliament.

These colonies formed the six states of Australia; New South Wales, Victoria, Western Australia, South Australia (included the Northern Territory at this time), Queensland and Tasmania. In 1901, the six states were united as the Commonwealth of Australia, under a new federal constitution. In 1911, the Northern Territory was transferred from South Australia to the Commonwealth and formed a territory.

=== Capital selection ===
Location of Canberra

After Federation in 1901, it was always assumed the Australian capital would be on the mainland. However, the location of the capital sparked years of negotiating between politicians in New South Wales and Victoria, the two most prominent states, who each wanted their capital, Sydney and Melbourne respectively, to become the new country's capital.

After years of debate to no avail, the two states decided on a compromise that met the requirements of the Australian Constitution. A separate territory (the Australian Capital Territory) was to be established on land given by New South Wales, however it must be at least 100 miles (160 km) from Sydney. This territory would contain the official capital of Australia, and Parliament would sit in Melbourne until the city (now Canberra) was built. In 1909, this compromise was agreed upon and was finally legislated in 1911.

On 12 March 1913, Canberra was officially named as the capital of Australia. In 1915, Jervis Bay territory was added to the Australian Capital Territory to ensure the Commonwealth had a seaport.

== See also ==
- Fauna of Australia
- Flora of Australia
- Natural history of Australia
- Geography of Australia
- List of islands of Australia
- States and territories of Australia
- European exploration of Australia
