= Geography of Australia =

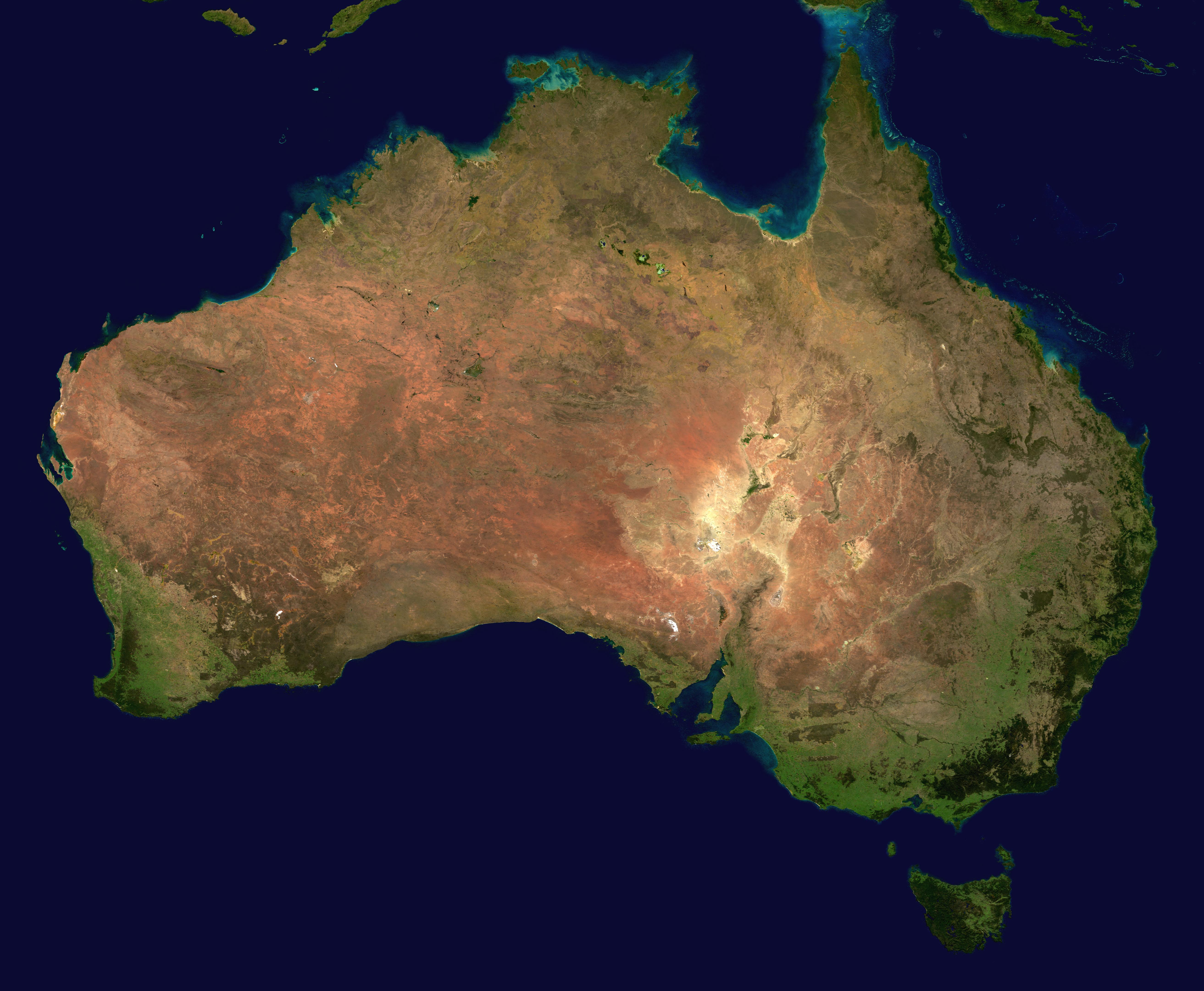
- Continent: Australia (continent)
- Region: Australasia/Oceania
- Coordinates: 23°33′S 133°23′E
- Area: Ranked 6th
  - Total: 7,688,287 km^{2} (2,968,464 sq mi)
- Coastline: 59,681 km (37,084 mi)
- Borders: None
- Highest point: Mount Kosciuszko; 2,228 m (7,310 ft) (mainland); Mawson Peak; 2,745 m (9,006 ft) (Australian territory)
- Lowest point: Lake Eyre, −15 m (−49 ft)
- Longest river: Murray River, 2,375 km (1,476 mi)
- Largest lake: Lake Eyre; 9,500 km^{2} (3,668 sq mi)
- Exclusive economic zone: 8,148,250 km^{2} (3,146,060 mi^{2})

Australia, officially the Commonwealth of Australia, is a sovereign country comprising the mainland of the Australian continent, the island state of Tasmania, and thousands of minor islands. It occupies a total area of 7,688,287 km^{2} (2,968,464 sq mi), making it the sixth-largest country in the world. Located in the Southern Hemisphere between the Indian and Pacific oceans, Australia's jurisdiction spreads across thousands of kilometres beyond the main landmass, including Norfolk Island, Christmas Island, the Cocos (Keeling) Islands, the Coral Sea Islands, Ashmore and Cartier Islands, the Heard and McDonald Islands in the southern Indian Ocean and thousands of other islands, as well as the Australian Antarctic Territory, a territorial claim covering almost half of the continent.

The country's geography encompasses a wide range of environments, from arid and semi-arid interior regions to tropical rainforests, temperate woodlands, and alpine areas. Most of the population lives in the temperate coastal zones of the east, southeast, and southwest, while the heartland—known as the Outback—is sparsely populated and characterised by semi-arid and desert landscapes. Australia's geographic isolation and environmental variety have contributed to its distinctive landforms and exceptionally high levels of endemic biodiversity. Furthermore, its peculiar position in the middle of the Australian plate makes Australian territory one of the least geologically active in the world, with little volcanic and seismic activity.

== Physical geography ==
=== Location and boundaries ===
Geographical distinctions between Australasia, Australian continent, the Commonwealth of Australia and Mainland Australia, clockwise from the top left

Australia is a sovereign country located at 23°33′S 133°23′E (geodetic median point), within the loosely defined region of Australasia/Oceania (Note: Both geographical terms are often treated as coterminous.) in the Southern Hemisphere of the Earth. Officially known as the Commonwealth of Australia, its territory comprises the mainland of the Australian continent, (Note: In numerous sources, Australia is regarded as both a country and a continent.) the island state of Tasmania (separate from the rest of the mainland by the Bass Strait) and another 8,222 islands ranging from minor fringing islets to larger landmasses. This makes Australia the sixth-largest country in the world by land area of jurisdiction, which comprises 7,688,287 km^{2} (2,968,464 sq mi).

Beyond its continental boundaries, Australia's sovereign territory extends far into surrounding oceans, with external and remote islands scattered across thousands of kilometres of ocean in an expanse extending from Antarctica almost to the equator. Some of these, such as Macquarie Island (Tasmania) and Lord Howe Island (New South Wales) are legally parts of states, but many are included in separate territories such as the Cocos Islands, Heard and McDonald Islands, Norfolk Island, Christmas Island, the Coral Sea Islands and Ashmore and Cartier Islands. Excluding Tasmania, Australian islands cover an area of 32,160 km^{2} (12,420 sq mi). Although it has no land borders, Australia shares boundaries with Timor Leste, Papua New Guinea, Indonesia, Solomon Islands, New Caledonia (France) and New Zealand through its extensive maritime jurisdiction.

==== Extreme points ====
The points that are farther north, south, east or west than any other location in mainland Australia and Tasmania are as follows:

- The northernmost point is in Cape York Peninsula (10°41′21″S 142°31′50″E)
- The southernmost point is in Tasmania Island in the South East Cape (43°38′40″S 146°49′30″E)
- The easternmost point is Cape Byron, few kilometres east of Byron Bay (28°38′15″S 153°38′14″E)
- The westernmost point is Steep Point in Shark Bay (26°09′5″S 113°09′18″E)

Taking into account its land extremities, continental Australia stretches approximately 3,860 km (2,400 mi) from its northernmost point to its southernmost point in Tasmania, and nearly 4,000 km (2,500 mi) from east to west.

Mainland Australia's highest point is Mount Kosciuszko (2,228 m (7,310 ft) above sea level), located within the Australian Alps, while the highest point on Australian sovereign territory is Mawson Peak on Heard Island, which is 2,745 m (9,006 ft) high and forms the summit of an active volcano called Big Ben. On the other hand, the country's lowest point is found on the bed of the Lake Eyre (15 m (49 ft) below sea level), located at the heart of the extensive Lake Eyre Basin.

=== Physiographic divisions ===
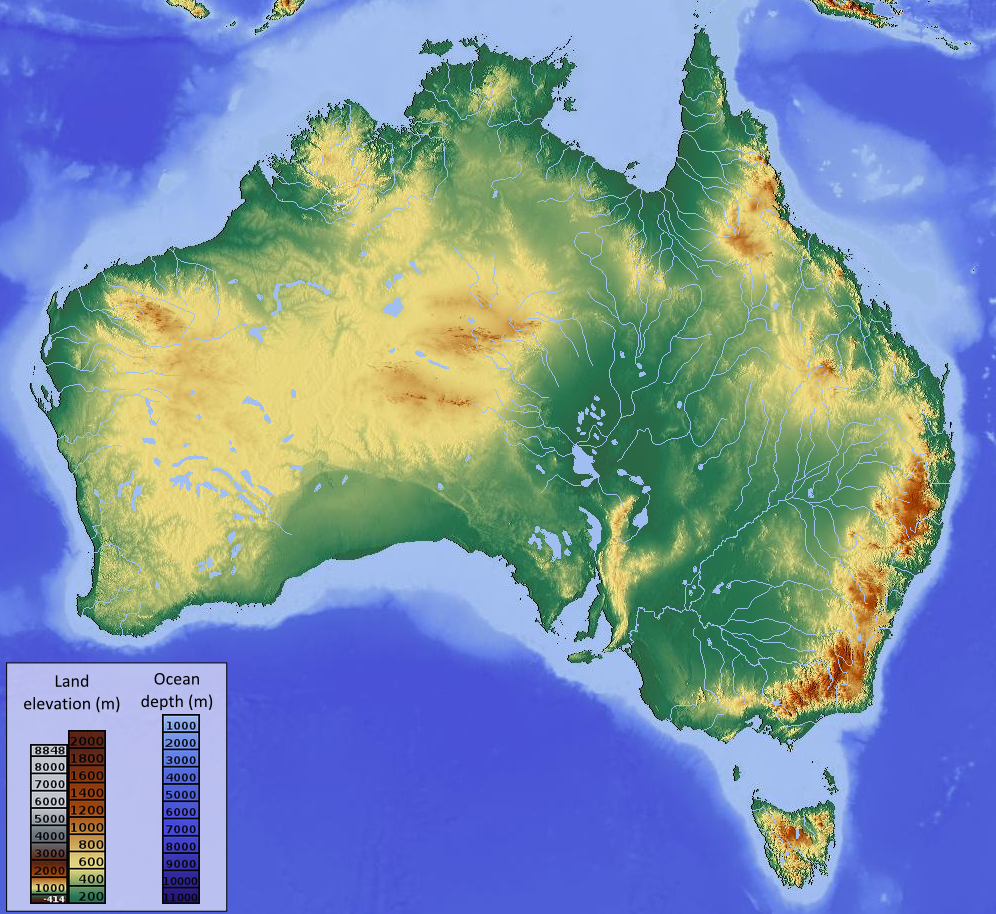
Relief map of Australia

Unlike other major landmasses, where some landscapes date back only tens of thousands of years, when great ice sheets retreated, the age of landforms in Australia is generally measured in many millions of years. This gives Australia a very distinctive physical geography, having the lowest continental topography in the world, with an average elevation of only 330 m (1,080 ft); around 86.77% of the country's surface (excluding islands) does not exceed an altitude of 500 m (1,600 ft).

==== Four-region model ====
Mainland Australia can be broadly divided into four major landform regions classified by climate, geology, tectonics, and elevation: the Coastal Plains, the Eastern Highlands, the Central Lowlands and the Western Plateau.

Along the eastern seaboard of the mainland are the Coastal Plains, a narrow strip of land along the eastern continental coastline of Australia from Queensland to Victoria. However, other sources refer to the Coastal Plains as the entire coastline of the mainland, outspreading beyond the east coast. This area is flat and has relatively high rainfall, making it suitable for human settlement and thus the most densely populated area in Australia. Towards the west, the flat land rises to the Great Dividing Range which runs parallel to the east coast from the tip of the Cape York Peninsula in Queensland almost 4,000 km (2,500 mi) south to the Grampians in Victoria. This separates rivers flowing to the west and north from those flowing to the Pacific. This region, known as the Eastern Highlands, is made up of a series of mountains in the south topped by Mount Kosciuszko and volcanic plugs, ash domes and flow remnants further north. West of the Highlands lie the Central Lowlands, stretching from Australia's largest river basin, the Murray-Darling, through the Great Artesian Basin, extending north to the Gulf of Carpentaria. Further to the west, the Western Plateau forms a relatively flat area about less than 500 m (1,600 ft) above sea level with numerous low mountain ranges such as the MacDonnell and Musgrave Ranges as well as some individual structures, of which the best known is Uluru. This area makes up one third of the country.

==== Loffler et al. model ====
According to Lofflet et al. (1983), the Australian continental landmass can be divided into six smaller landform divisions. These are:

- The Eastern Highlands—including the Great Dividing Range, the fertile Brigalow Belt strip of grassland behind the east coast, and the Eastern Uplands
- The Eastern alluvial Plains and Lowlands—the Murray Darling basin covers the southern part; also includes parts of the Lake Eyre basin and extends to the Gulf of Carpentaria
- The South Australian Highlands—including the Flinders Ranges, Eyre Peninsula, and Yorke Peninsula
- The Western Plateau—including the Nullarbor Plain
- The Central Deserts
- Northern Plateau and Basins—including the Top End

==== Tasmania ====
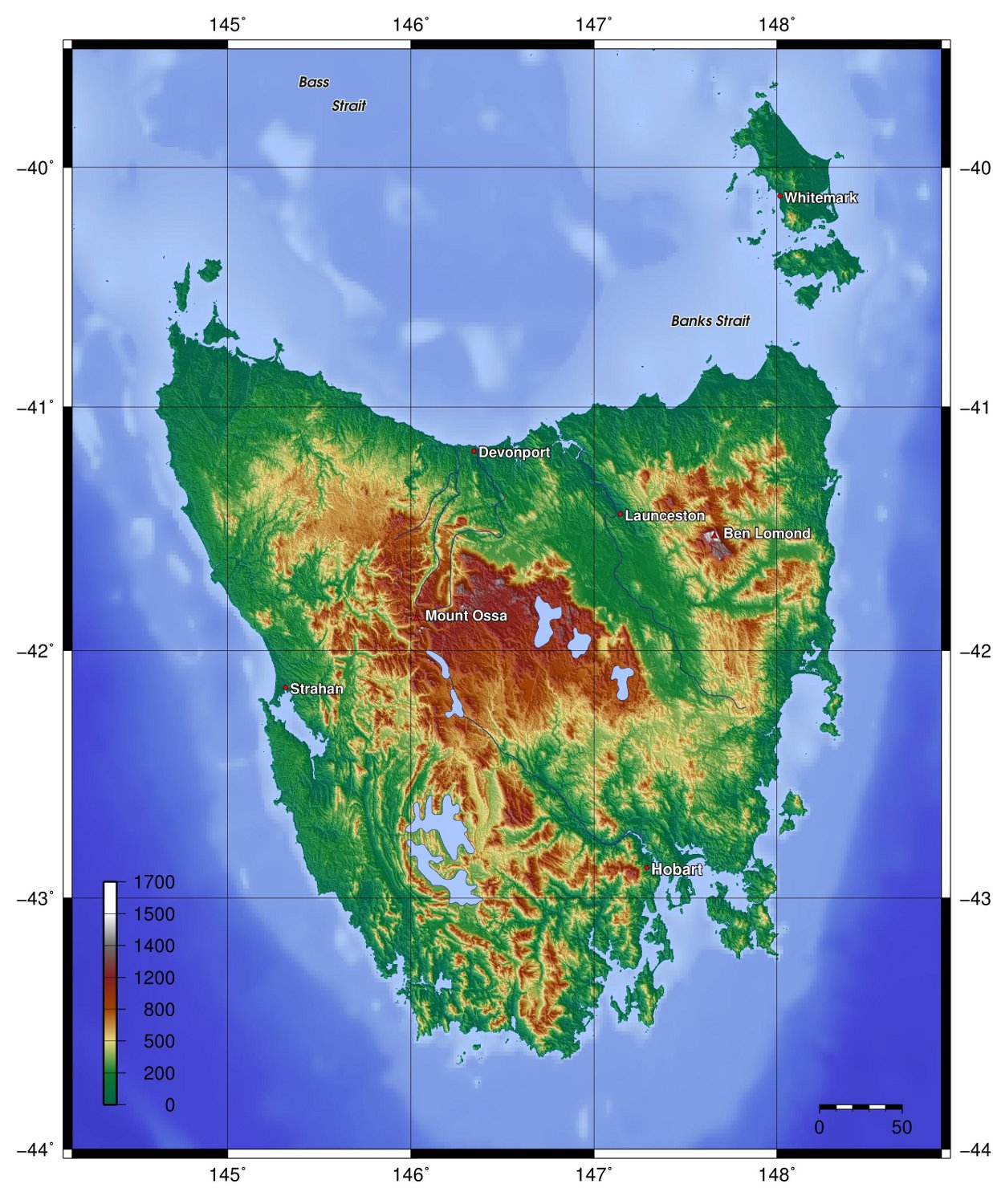
Relief map of Tasmania

Tasmania, the island state, has its own topographic distinctions. The Tasmanian central east area, known as the Midlands, is fairly flat by comparison and is predominantly used for agriculture. The most mountainous region is the Central Highlands area, which covers most of the central west parts of the state. Tasmanian mountain ranges have a 'rounded smoothness', similar to that of mainland.

=== Geology ===
==== Components ====
Australia's onshore geology is divided into five principal provinces: Archaean to Paleoproterozoic cratons, Palaeo to Mesoproterozoic orogenic belts, Meso to Neoproterozoic sedimentary basins, Paleozoic rocks of the Tasman Foldbelt, and Mesozoic rocks of the Great Artesian Basin. The country contains some of the oldest geological features in the world, with the oldest known rocks dating from more than 3000 million years ago and rare zircon crystals dating back 4400 million years. Other regions, however, are geologically much younger, shaped by volcanic activity that continued until only a few thousand years ago. Geomorphologist Charles Rowland Twidale has estimated that between 10% and 20% of Australia's present-day landscapes developed during the Mesozoic Era, when the continent was part of Gondwana.

==== Geologic history ====
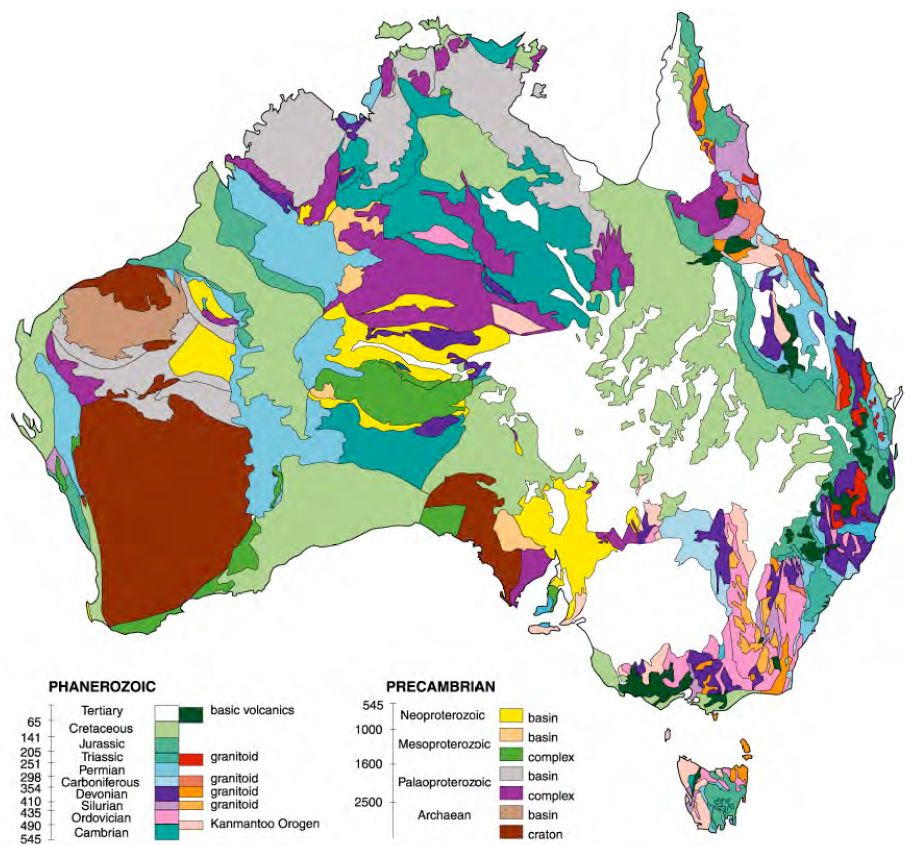
Basic geological units of Australia

Australia is located on the lowest, flattest, and oldest continental landmass on Earth. Most of the country's topography is a result of prolonged erosion by wind and water, and its shape is the product of tectonic Earth movements and long-term changes in sea level. These geological forces such as the tectonic uplift of mountain ranges and clashes between tectonic plates occurred mainly in its early prehistory, when it was still a part of Gondwana. The breakup of Gondwana began around 165 million years ago, though the separation of the Australian plate was a slow process. In fact, the Australian plate, along with Antarctica, was one of the last major continental plates of Gondwana to separate, doing so about 45 million years ago. During the Pleistocene (2.6 million to 11,700 years ago), Australia was part of Sahul, a paleocontinent that included the landmasses of Australia and New Guinea, as well as the land bridges that once connected them.

==== Geologic activity ====
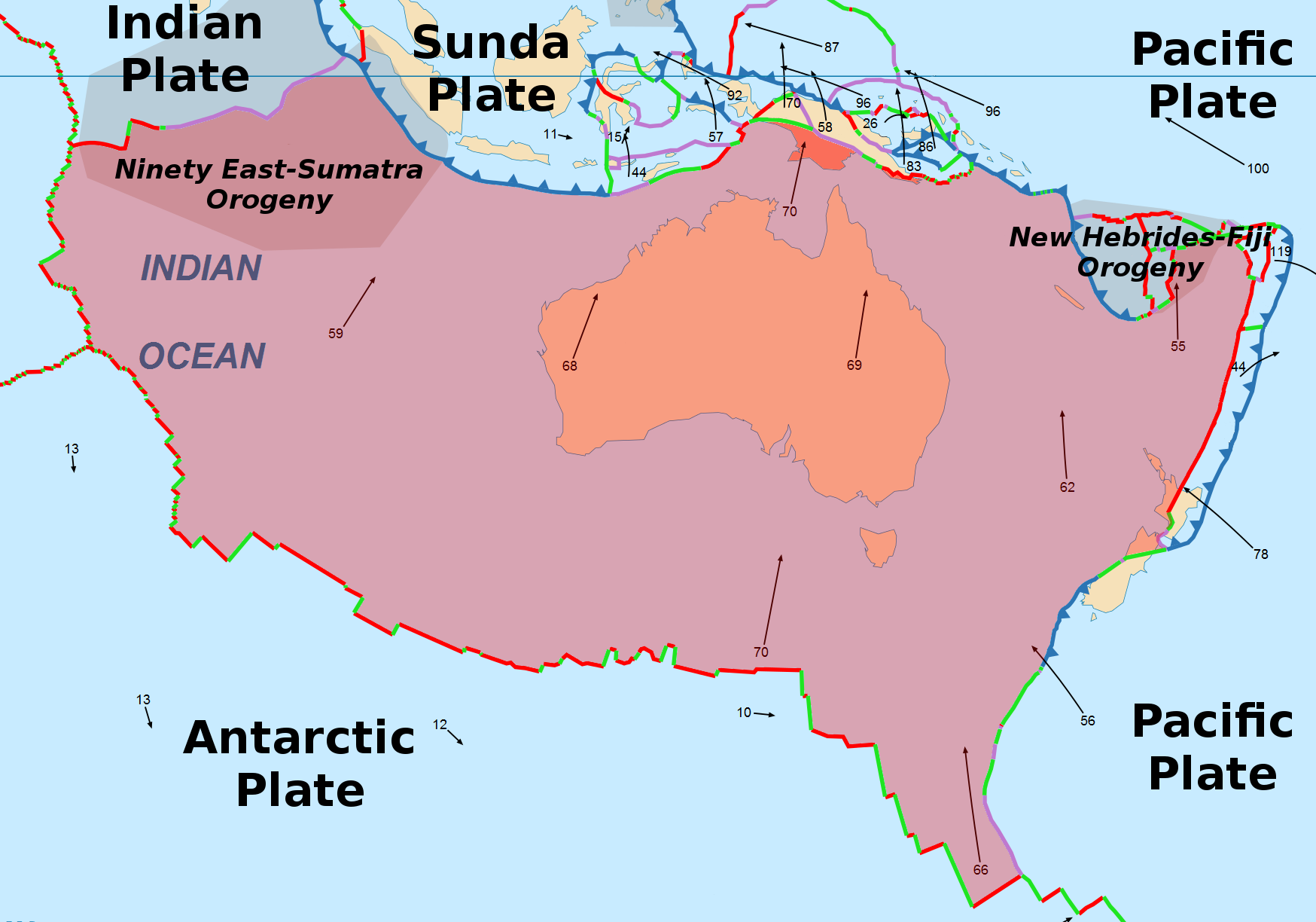
Map showing the Australian plate and its movement directions

Most of Australia lies near the centre of the continent's namesake tectonic plate, making it one of the most geologically stable landmasses on Earth. Although the country contains the Newer Volcanics Province—a volcanic field in the southeast that has been dormant for about 5,000 years—significant volcanic activity is rare. The only currently active volcanoes under Australian jurisdiction are found about 4,000 km (2,500 mi) southwest of Perth, on Heard Island and the nearby McDonald Islands. Earthquakes occur regularly, though most are minor and cause no damage; major events exceeding magnitude 6 typically happen about once every five years.

=== Hydrology ===
==== Surface water ====
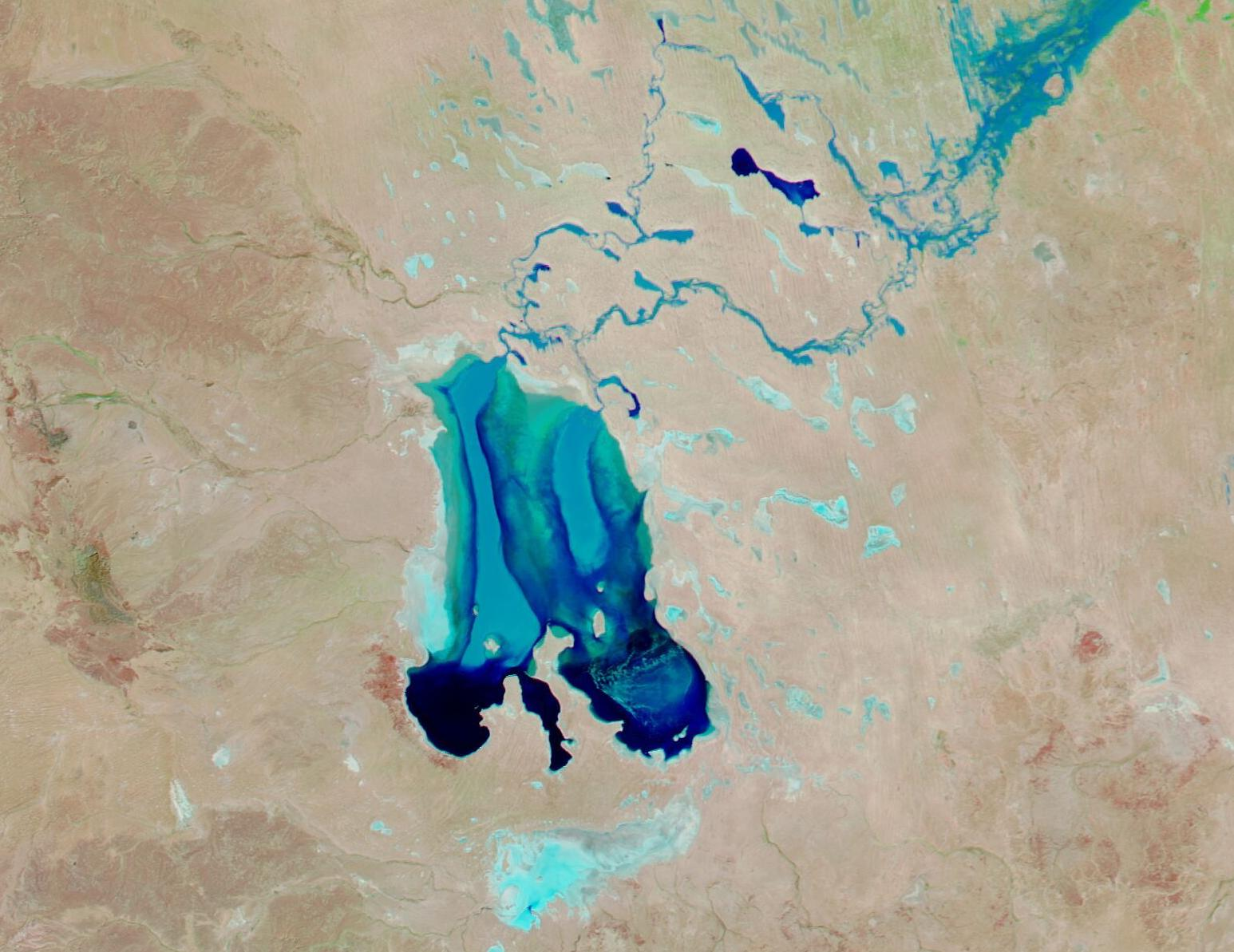
Satellital image of Lake Eyre and the endorheic basin that discharge in it

As being situated in the driest inhabited continent, Australia has few large, fast-flowing rivers or permanent lakes. Many rivers experience highly irregular flow patterns, with prolonged periods of low discharge followed by occasional years of flooding. About half of Australia's rivers drain inland, often terminating in ephemeral salt lakes. As an example, the Lake Eyre, the largest one in Australia with an area of up 9,700 km^{2} (3,700 sq mi) when it is full, usually contains little or no water as its catchment is entirely within the arid zones. The country's natural freshwater lakes occur mainly along the coast as lakes or lagoons, while inland water bodies are typically wetlands or saline lakes located in the arid interior. Glacial lakes and volcanic crater lakes are found primarily in Tasmania In a worldwide comparison of height, Australia's waterfalls are modest in size, with the highest ranked only 135th by total drop according to the World Waterfall Database. The nation also contains about 758 estuaries, most of which are located in tropical and subtropical regions.

==== Rainfall ====
Australia's rainfall regime is highly variable, with low mean annual rainfall over most of the continent and heavy seasonal falls in the tropics, concentric around the continent's extensive arid core. The effects of this varied rainfall pattern and Australia's drainage system can result in parts of the continent being in drought, but inundated by water from rainfall thousands of kilometres away. Rainfall generally increases towards the coast as proximity to both moisture sources and reliable rain-producing weather systems improves. Elevation also has an important influence on rainfall, with the mountain areas of northeastern Queensland, southeastern Australia and western Tasmania receiving higher rainfall totals. On average, only 9% of Australia's rainfall is converted to surface runoff, and about 2% percolates through the ground to recharge groundwater.

==== Drainage basins ====
Map of major drainage basins as defined by the Bureau of Meteorology

Continental Australia is divided into drainage divisions, which are subdivided into water regions and then into river basins. The drainage divisions depict where water flows across the continent and identify the major hydrological basins. Due to Australia's high variation in rainfall and streamflow, large reservoirs have been built in its main river basins to ensure reliable supply; in fact, the national per-person surface-water storage capacity in 2018 was about 3.25 ML, relatively high compared to other countries. Groundwater also plays a significant role as a supply for drinking water, industry, farming and other primary industries in the many regions where it is the only reliable water source. Iconic groundwater resources in Australia include the Great Artesian Basin, one of the largest underground freshwater resources in the world and Australia's largest groundwater basin. It spans almost 1,700,000 km^{2} (660,000 sq mi) which is over one-fifth of the Australian continent.

== Oceanography ==
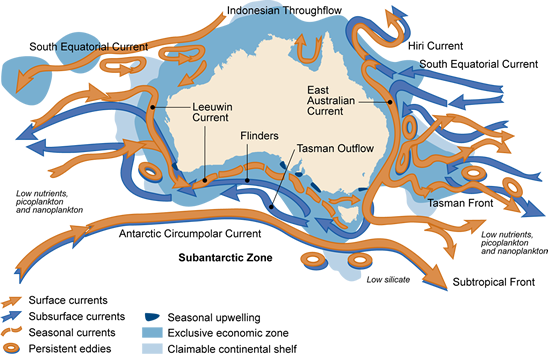
Sea surface and sub-surface currents, gyres and eddies around Australia

Australia's oceans and seas include those off the mainland and its offshore territories in the Pacific, Indian and Southern oceans as well as the Timor, Tasman, Coral and Arafura seas. This sprawling territory gives Australia the third largest area of ocean jurisdiction of any country on Earth, and the third largest exclusive economic zone (8,148,250 km^{2} (3,146,060 sq mi)). The Australian mainland has a total coastline length of 35,821 km (22,258 mi) with an additional 23,860 km (14,830 mi) of insular coastline. The continental margin within the Australian EEZ can be divided into six distinct geomorphological parts around the main landmass and the Lord Howe and Norfolk Rises; Cocos-Keeling, Christmas Islands and Macquarie Island Margins around overseas territories.

Australia is surrounded by various ocean currents that have a strong controlling influence on things such as climate, ecosystems, fish migrations, the transport of ocean debris and on water quality. Pacific surface waters are dominated by the warm East Australian Current while, in the Australian western coasts, Leeuwin Current predominates. There are also a number of sub-surface countercurrents of colder temperatures. A recent global remote sensing analysis suggested that there was 8,866 km^{2} (3,423 sq mi) of tidal flat area in Australia, making it the third-ranked country in terms of how much tidal flat occurs there. Tides are predominant on the northwest coast, where the greatest tidal range in the country occurs, with a highest astronomical tide higher than 10 m (33 ft). Australian ocean salinity is also unevenly distributed: to the north and south of the continent, the oceanic areas have lower salinity due to freshwater inputs from high rainfall and melting sea ice, respectively, compared to the oceanic areas surrounding most of Australia; the salinity of the ocean regions south of the tropics and above the Southern Ocean is higher due to high evaporation and low rainfall.

== Economic geography and natural resources ==
Australia's energy resources and export ports

The spatial structure of Australia's economy is extremely one-sided. According to current technology, 35% of the country's territory is unsuitable for any kind of farming. A further 44% is only suitable for extremely extensive livestock farming. Only 21% of the country's territory has been developed for more intensive agriculture and more closed settlements, but frequent droughts also pose a serious threat to agricultural activity. Within this latter zone lies the 2% of the territory where the great majority of population and social product are concentrated.

Australia's geological characteristics endow it with a vast reserve of diverse minerals. The country produces 19 useful minerals in significant quantities from more than 350 operating mines in all states, the Northern Territory and Christmas Island (the latter known for its phosphate reserves). Australia is one of the world's leading producers of bauxite (aluminium ore), iron ore, lithium, gold, lead, diamond, rare-earth elements, uranium and zinc; in addition to being the fifth largest producer, the second largest exporter and having the third largest reserves of coal in the world. Australia's exclusive economic zone area is of 8,148,250 km^{2} (3,146,060 mi^{2}), the third largest in the world. Its onshore waters are home to substantial conventional gas resources, primarily in the southwest, making it the world's seventh largest exporter of natural gas. Despite containing one of the largest fishing areas in the world, it is a minor producer of fisheries products, primarily because of the relatively low biological productivity of the Australian marine environment.

Given its vast reserves, coal is Australia's largest energy resource; it contributed 46% of total electricity generation in 2023. Continental Australia has the highest solar radiation per square metre of any continental landmass and consequently some of the best solar energy resources in the world; its territory also enjoys high wind energy potential thanks to its particular location into the westerly wind belts. In 2023, 35% of Australia's total electricity generation was from renewable energy sources, including solar (16%), wind (12%) and hydro (6%).

== Political geography ==
Australia and its overseas territories (including Antarctic territorial claims)

The Commonwealth of Australia consists of six states, two major mainland territories, and other minor territories. The states are New South Wales, Queensland, South Australia, Tasmania, Victoria, and Western Australia; and the two major mainland territories are the Northern Territory and the Australian Capital Territory. The minor territories comprise the Jervis Bay Territory, as a naval base and seaport for the national capital which the federal government administers a separate area within New South Wales and the following inhabited external territories: Norfolk Island, Christmas Island, Cocos (Keeling) Islands, and the largely uninhabited external territories of Ashmore and Cartier Islands, Coral Sea Islands, and Heard Island and McDonald Islands. Australia also claims ownership of more than 42% of the Antarctic continent as the Australian Antarctic Territory, although this claim is recognised by just four sovereign states.

Across the Australian states and territories there are over 500 local government bodies, often called councils, municipalities or shires. These local authorities include city councils in urban centres, and regional and shire councils in rural areas.

== Population geography ==
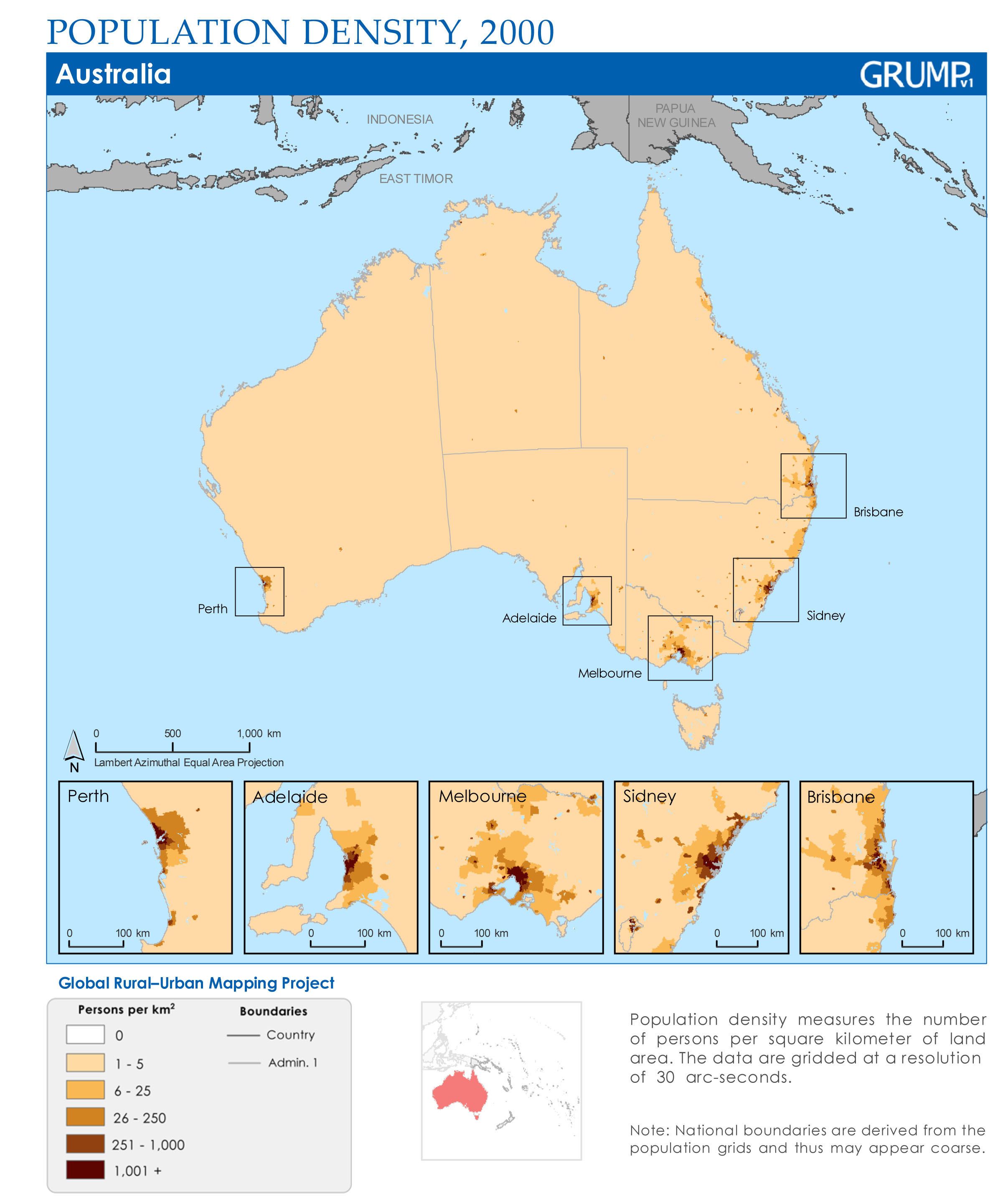
Map of population density across mainland Australia and Tasmania in 2000

Australia's population was 27.2 million at 30 June 2024, having grown around 1.4% a year on average over the past 3 decades. Due to various geographical features, almost 80% of the Australian population live within 25 km (16 mi) of the coast, with 73% on its inhabitants living in the major coastal urban centres. The most densely populated geographic areas of the country are located in the Coastal Plains of the eastern states of Australia and the Swan Coastal Plain and its surroundings, on the southwestern corner of the mainland, leaving the vast centre of the country virtually uninhabited. This disparity can be seen reflected in Australia's mean population density of 3.5/km^{2} (9.1/sq mi) as of 2024, one of the lowest in the world. In the same year, Australia's centre of population was around 30 km (19 mi) east of Ivanhoe in western New South Wales, reflecting the concentration of population in south-east Australia. Given its extreme geographic isolation between population clusters, Australia is sometimes described as a "[demographical] archipelago".

Australia's population is diverse. According to the 2021 Census, almost half (48%) of Australians have a parent born overseas. The main countries of origin of these immigrants are England, India, China and New Zealand, with all four countries having more than 500,000 residents in Australia as of 2020. Its population also has a significant Indigenous compound in each state and territory, comprising hundreds of groups that have their own distinct set of languages, histories and cultural traditions. In 2021, there were an estimated 812,728 Indigenous Australians, representing 3.2% of the population. Northern Territory has the greatest proportion of Indigenous population, at 26.3%. This First Peoples have lived across Australian continent for tens of thousands of years, managing and caring for the land and shaping the environment and its biota. According to Australia's land tenure, pastoral leases cover 44% of the territory and about 40% is covered by native title, in both exclusive and shared title. Furthermore, 14.9% of the Australian surface is considered public land.

== Climate ==
Climate map of Australia

Australia is separated from the polar regions by the Southern Ocean; therefore, it is not subject to cold polar air movements during winter of the kind that sweep the northern hemisphere continents during their winters. Consequently, the mainland Australian winter is relatively mild, with less contrast between summer and winter temperatures than on the northern continents, although the transition is more pronounced in Australia's alpine regions and at high altitudes. Seasonal maximum and minimum temperatures can be considerable, with temperatures ranging from a maximum of 40 °C (104 °F) in the central desert regions to 0 °C (32 °F) in the higher regions of the south-east. Based on the Köppen classification, mainland Australia and Tasmania hosts six major groups and 27 sub-groups of climate zones, ranging from subtropical to equatorial climates at the northern tip to temperate climates in the southernmost parts and extensive deserts and grassland regions in the heartland. Apart from its continental landmass, Australian remote territories near the Antarctic Circle such as the Heard and McDonald archipelago shows a polar tundra climate unique in the entire country.

Australia's unique location beneath a subtropical high-pressure belt and surrounded by climate drivers like the El Niño–Southern Oscillation (ENSO) and the Indian Ocean Dipole (IOD)—massive oceanic and atmospheric circulation phenomena that affect flows of water and air—makes most of Western Australia a hot desert, and aridity a marked feature of most of the continent. In the west, the IOD is associated with more rainfall (if the IOD is negative) or less rainfall (if the IOD is positive) across the Top End and southern Australia, as well as with differences in degree of cloud cover in the northwest. In the east, ENSO can bring flooding rains to central and eastern regions in the "La Niña" (positive) phase and droughts in the "El Niño" (negative) phase. This climate drivers results in significant spatial and temporal variable rainfall patterns, with frequent droughts lasting several seasons. According to the Bureau of Meteorology, 80% of the land area receives less than 600 mm (24 in) of annual rainfall and 50% less than 300 mm (12 in). Overall, Australia has a very low average annual rainfall of 419 mm (16 in).

== Natural disasters ==
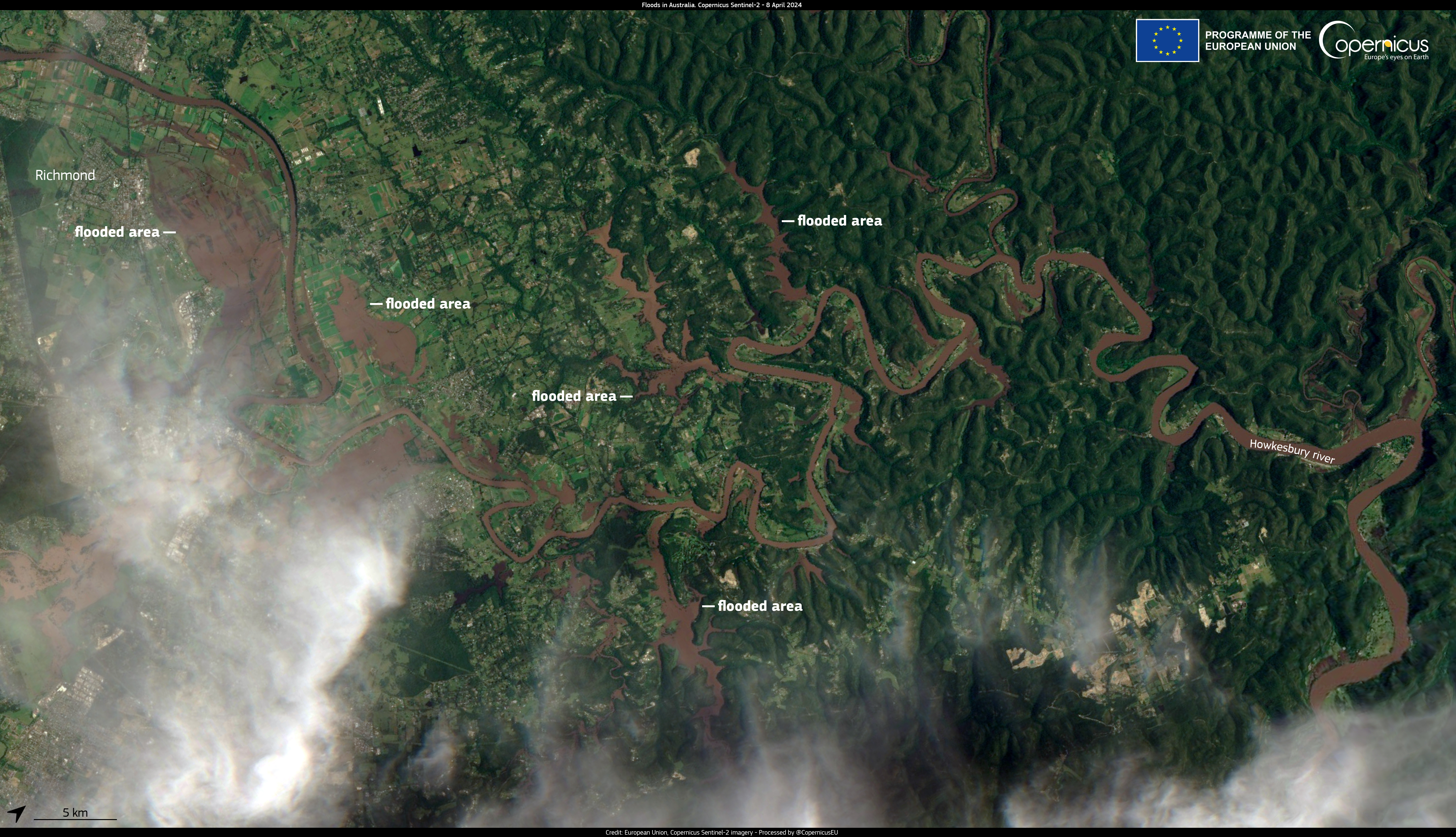
Satellital photo of flooded areas around Richmond, New South Wales in April 2024

Australia experiences a range of meteorological and geological hazards. Some natural hazards occur only in certain climatic, geological or topographic regions, while others have a high potential of occurring anywhere on the Australian continent. Natural disasters have helped to shape Australia's history. Notable examples include Cyclone Mahina (1899), Cyclone Tracy (1974), the Sydney hailstorm (1999), the floods in New South Wales (1955) and the Ash Wednesday bushfires (1983). Although the country has always experienced them, their frequency, severity and cost is increasing as climate change progresses.

=== Weather hazards ===
Cyclones in Australia are common, which the north-western coast in Western Australia being the most cyclone prone area in all of Australia. Additionally, cyclone formations can also occur off the north-eastern coast in Queensland, such as Cyclone Jasper and Cyclone Niran in recent years. Such cyclones cause widespread economic damage, and triggers floods and other disasters. Severe thunderstorms occur across the country between September and March, when the supply of solar energy is greatest. Northern Australia experiences violent thunderstorms that can have different characteristics to those that typically happen in the rest of the territory. These tropical severe thunderstorms are also different to conventional tropical cyclones. Although it's a much less common phenomena, tornado outbreaks can also occur. Based on historical records, between 30 and 80 tornadoes are observed in Australia each year.

=== Bushfires ===
Bushfires are an intrinsic part of Australia's environment. Natural ecosystems have evolved with fire, and the landscapes and their biological diversity have been shaped by and rely on patterns of fire. This is due to the unique flora that exists, which is highly flammable, and some species actually requiring fire to regenerate and spread. While bushfires can occur at any time of the year, the risk is the highest during the summer and autumn months for the majority of the country, and spring months for the most northern regions of the country.

=== Heatwaves ===
Heatwaves, or consecutive days of extreme temperatures, are also prominent in Australia. They are the deadliest natural disasters in Australia, accounting for more deaths than bushfires, cyclones, earthquakes, floods and severe storms combined. The number of days with a modest level of heat stress is increasing, as does the number of consecutive days of heat stress: the frequency doubled between 1960–70 and 2000–08.

=== Droughts ===
The prominence and severity of droughts in Australia has increased in recent times due to accelerated climate change. As Australia is the driest inhabited continent, such droughts can limit the streamflow of the few major rivers in the country, creating a myriad of knock-on effects. Droughts and climate variability are especially detrimental to Australian agricultural industries, who face unpredictability in their quantity of produce.

=== Floods ===
Riverine flooding in Australia occurs in relatively low-lying areas adjacent to streams and rivers. In the extensive flat inland regions, floods may spread over thousands of square kilometres and last several weeks, with flood warnings sometimes issued months in advance. Floods are by far the most economically costly natural disasters in Australia, averaging $8.8 billion per year as of 2017.

=== Earthquakes ===
While Australia is not a seismically active zone, it does experience small scale intraplate earthquakes, caused by compressive stresses built up over time, in the interior of the Australian tectonic plate. On average, around 100 earthquakes of above magnitude 3 are experienced in Australia every year, with the largest recorded earthquake occurring at Tennant Creek in the Northern Territory, with a magnitude of 6.6, in 1988. The 5.6 magnitude 1989 Newcastle earthquake, with 13 fatalities and over A$4 billion economic damage (in 2017 values) remains the most significant in Australia's recent seismic history.

== Time zones ==
Time zones across Australian territory

There are five standard time zones across mainland Australia and Lord Howe Island, a dependency of New South Wales, ranging from UTC+8:00 to UTC+11:00. Some of them are half-hour and quarter-hour time zones. Not all states and territories in Australia use daylight saving time (DST). The states that use DST are the Australian Capital Territory, New South Wales, South Australia, Tasmania, and Victoria. In contrast, Queensland, Western Australia and the Northern Territory do not employ this practice.

The Australian external territories of Cocos Islands, Norfolk Island, and Christmas Island similarly have their own time zones, and do not observe DST. Macquarie Island, a dependency of Tasmania, has no permanent population and its time zone can vary.

== Environment ==
Biogeographic regionalisation of Australia according to IBRA

The Commonwealth of Australia is a megadiverse country, one of the most biologically rich in the world. It supports nearly 600,000 native species of flora and fauna, with a high proportion found nowhere else in the world. About 85% of plant species, 45% of birds and 80% of mammals are endemic to Australia, with monotremes and marsupials showing the highest levels of endemism among the latter group. This exceptional endemism can be explained as a result of the long isolation period of the Australian territory from other continental landmasses since its Gondwana split about 40 million years ago. Australia also shows a rich variety of microorganisms like fungi and diatoms. In addition to the mainland environment, the more than 8,000 islands that make up the rest of the country have their own unique isolated ecosystems and species found nowhere else in the country. Interim Biogeographic Regionalisation for Australia (IBRA) classifies Australia's landscapes into 89 large geographically distinct bioregions and 419 subregions based on common climate, geology, landform, native vegetation and species information.

The 2021 State of the Environment report by the Australian Government's Department of Climate Change, Energy, the Environment and Water listed environmental issues including: soil erosion, poor offshore water quality, threats from introduced pest species (particularly island species, threatened by feral cats), degradation of natural resources, high prevalence of land and habitat clearing and extreme climatic events such as floods, droughts, wildfires, storms, and heatwaves. As of 2022, around 22% of Australia's landmass and almost half (45%) of Australia's oceans were protected in the National Reserve System, made up of over 14,500 terrestrial protected areas and 60 marine parks. Indigenous Protected Areas (IPAs) are areas of land and sea that "traditional owners" have agreed to manage for biodiversity conservation; they represent more than 54% of Australia's National Reserve System.

Bioclimatic landscapes of Australia

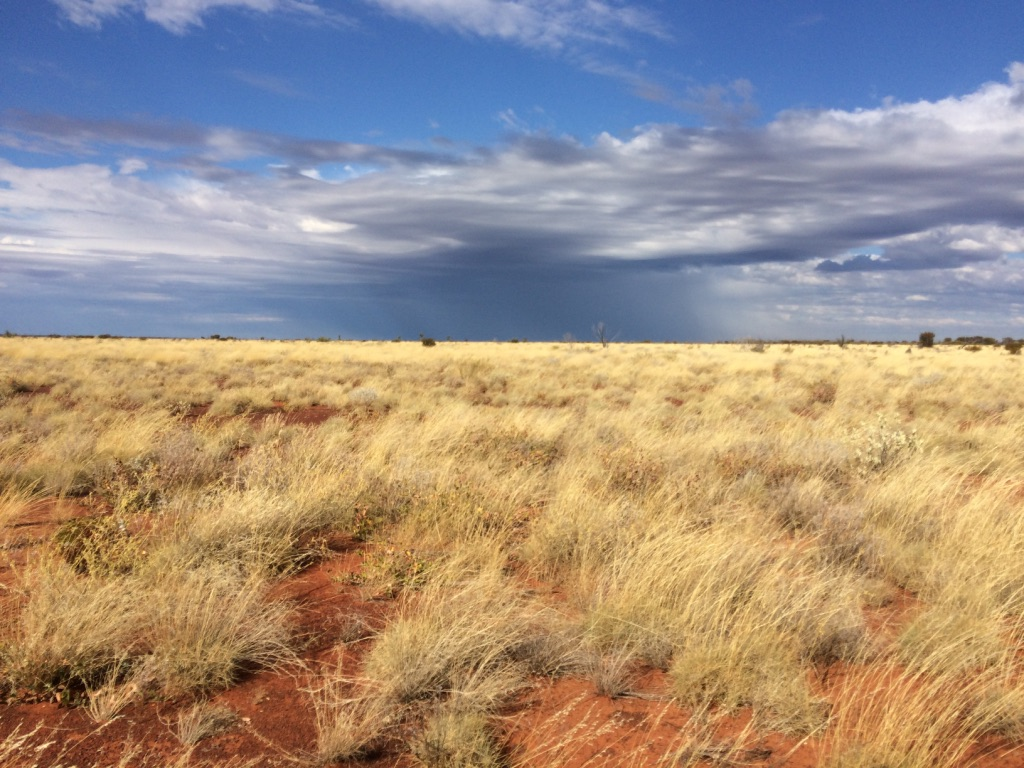
Gibson Desert

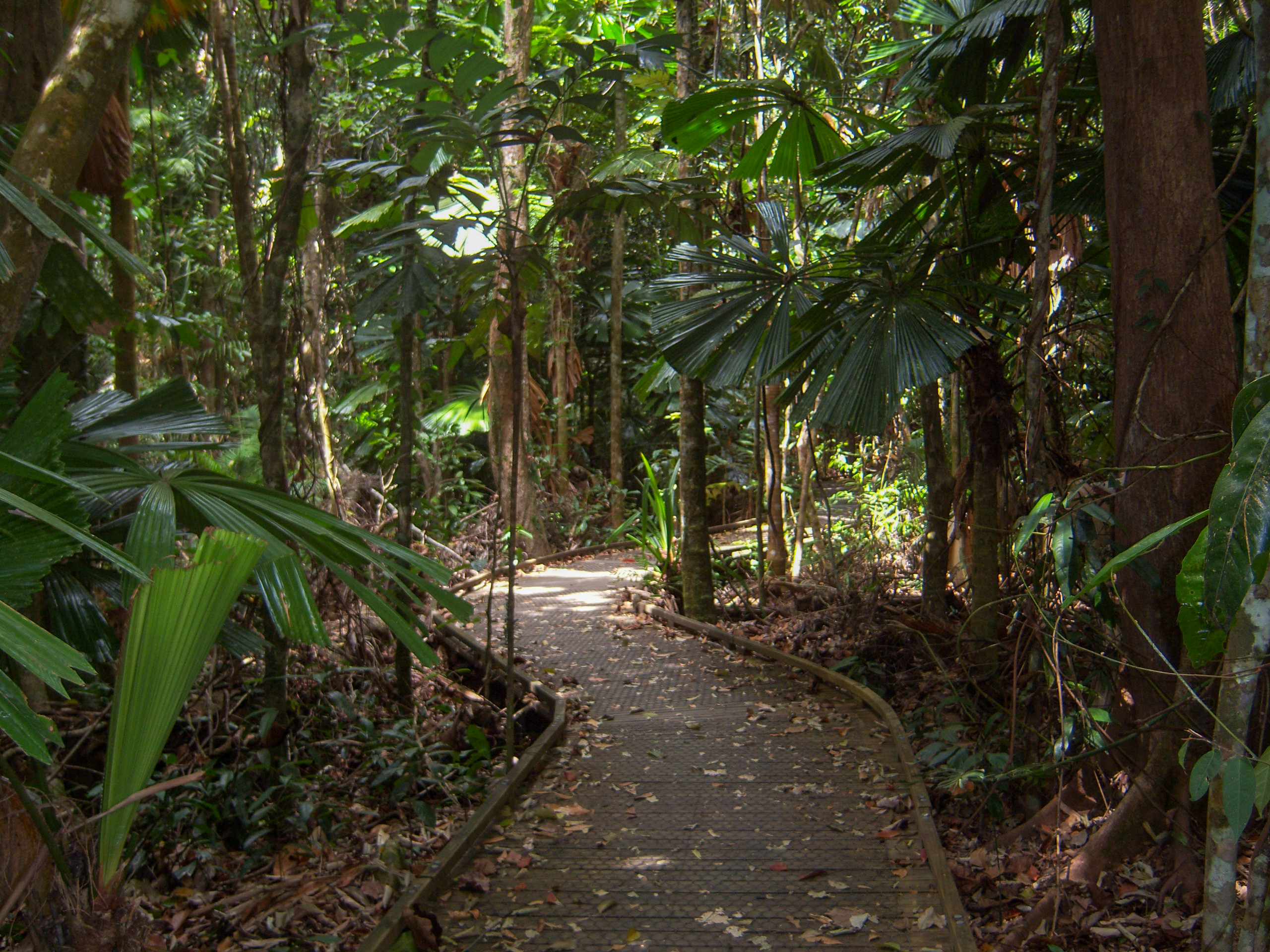
Daintree National Park

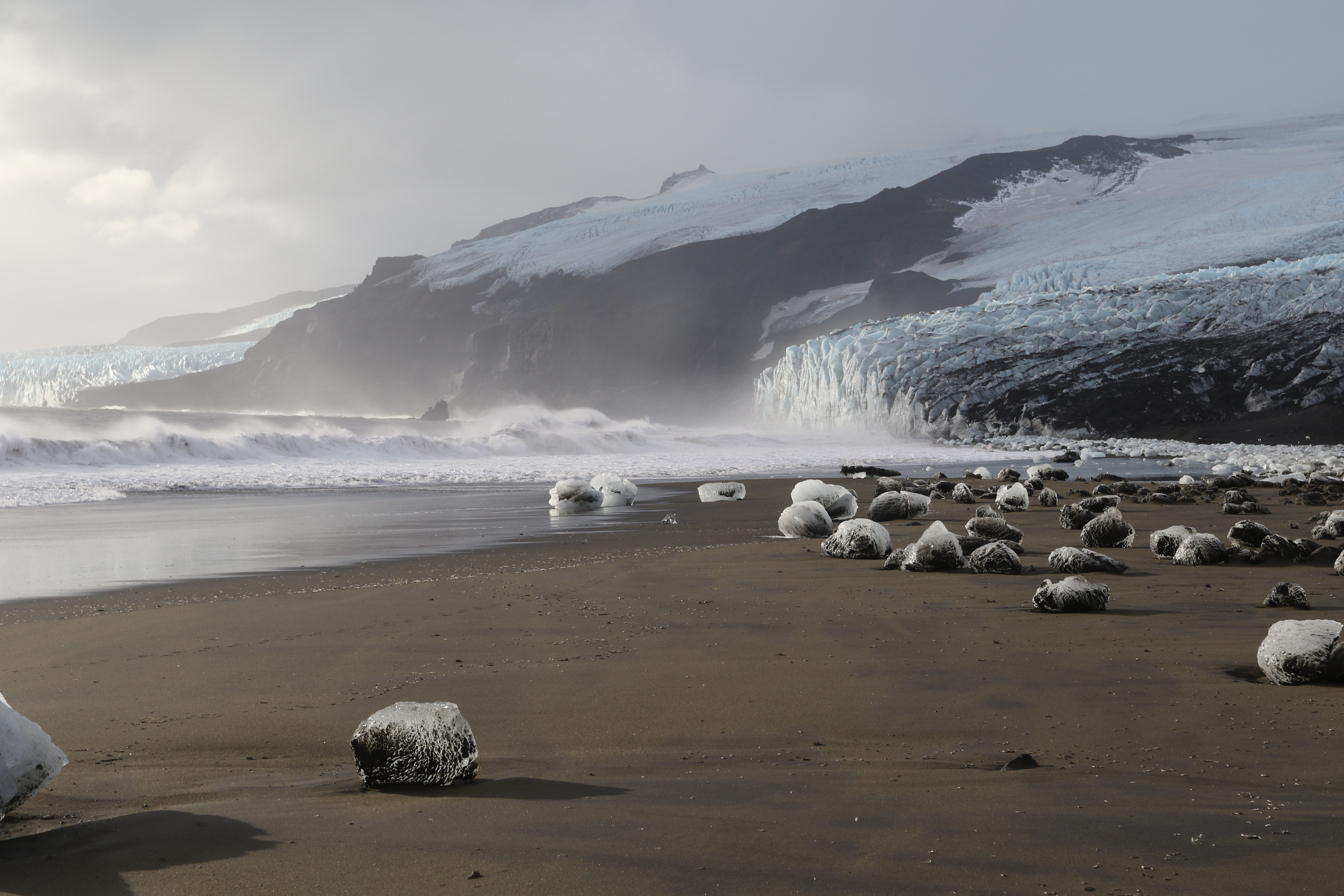
Heard Island

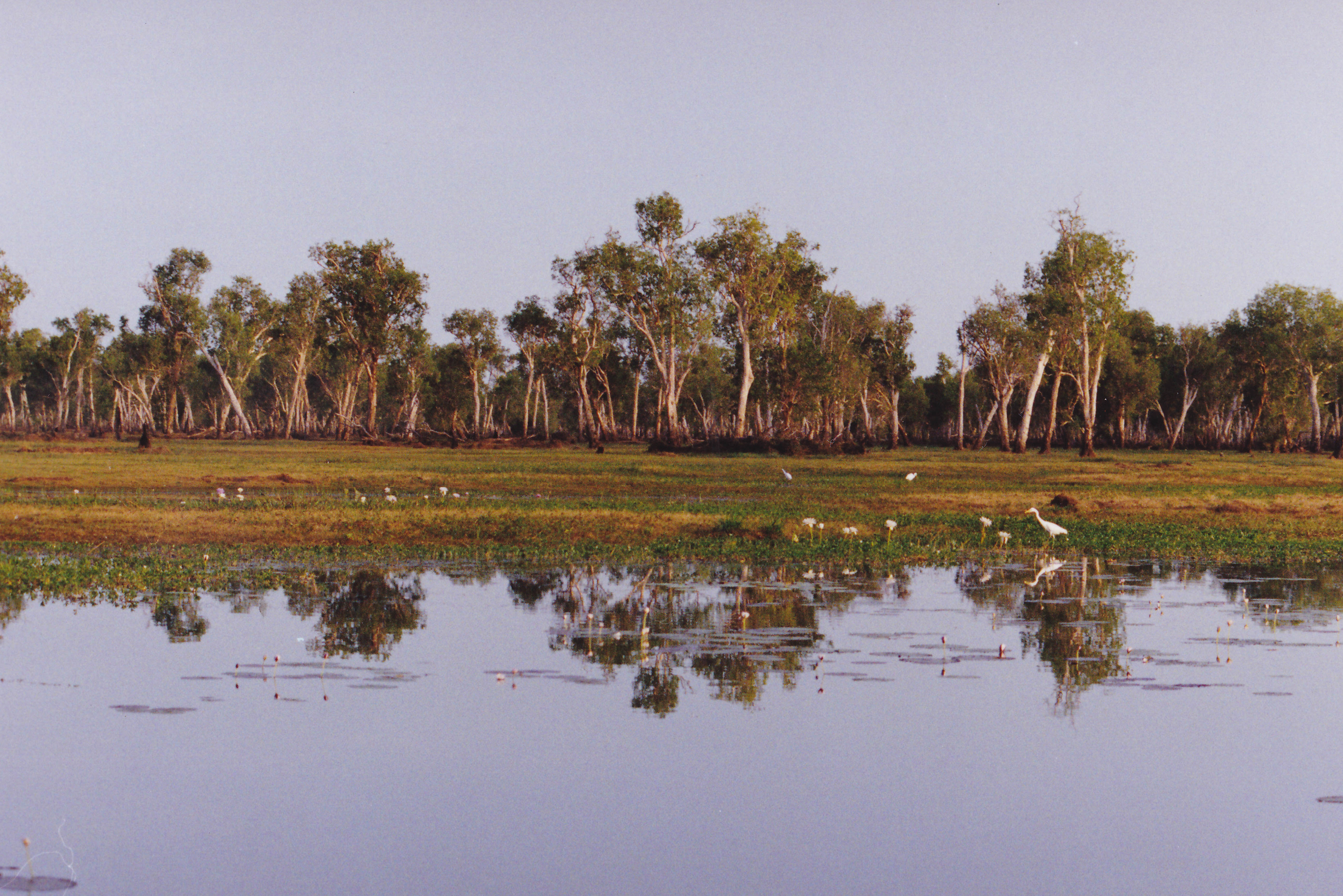
Kakadu National Park

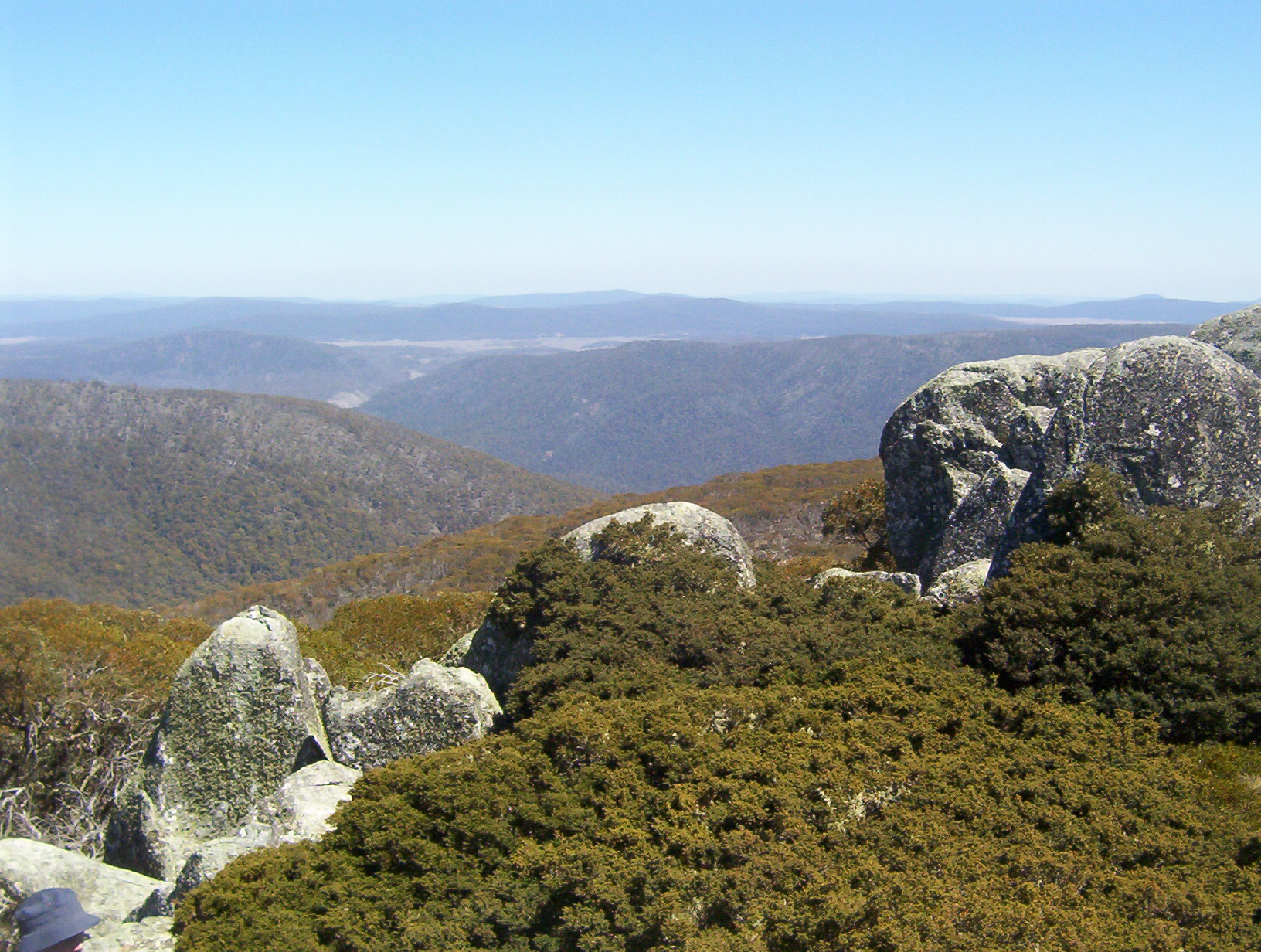
Namadgi National Park

== Popular culture ==
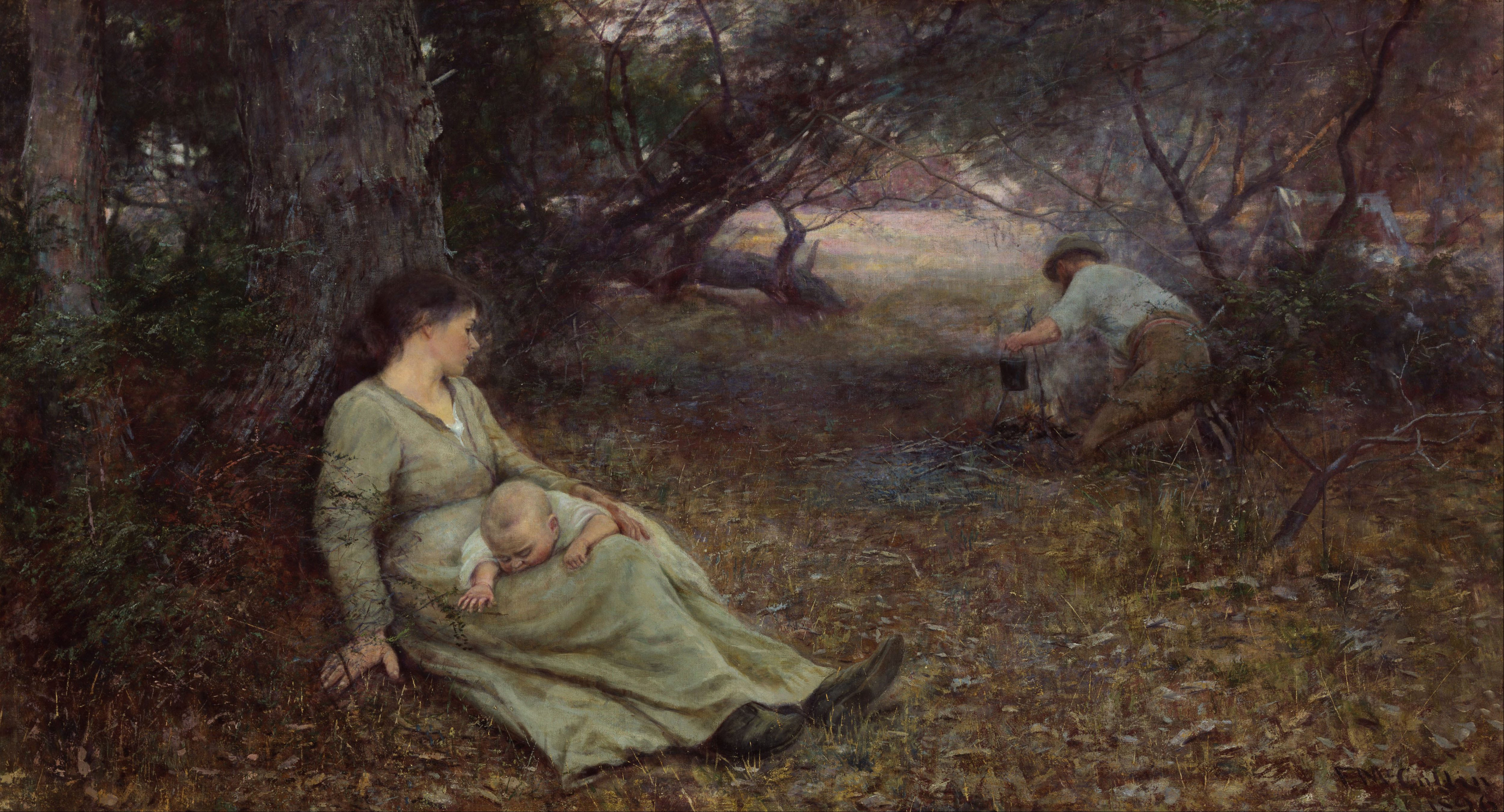
On the wallaby track, painted by the Australian artist Frederick McCubbin in 1896, depicts the rural "bush" lifestyle of itinerant workers known as swagman

Australians have shown a fascination and strong relationship with their land for thousands of years. Since ancient times before European exploration, Aboriginal peoples maintain a deep connection with their environment with "Country", a term often used to describe the lands, waterways and seas to which they are connected. The term “bush”, introduced by the first European settlers, has been used to describe the Australian hinterland. From the Australian point of view, "the bush is a legendary and fascinating place that has served as the setting for several films and works of literature of all genres (such as the Henry Lawson and Banjo Paterson bush poetry). It is a fascinating area for literary students, particularly from the late 19th century onward, during the period of national writing", and has played an important role in shaping Australian identity.

The concept of the Outback, the vast and remote heartland of the country, has long been embodied in the mythology, spirit and iconography of Australia. Without being a well-defined area, it has a consistent set of distinctive characteristics: remoteness from major population centres, low population density, largely unmodified natural environments—mostly arid and dry—and relatively infertile soils. It is considered the "quintessence of Australia", with characteristics and landmarks closely associated with that country.

Due to its relative remote location in the Southern Hemisphere, and after the fact that it was discovered in a time when European explorers—from their perspective—were searching for a land down under the Asian continent, Australia is colloquially called the "Land Down Under". Other epithets used for Australia that refer to its geography are the "sunburnt country" and the "wide brown land", phrases deriving from Dorothea Mackellar's 1908 poem "My Country".

== See also ==
- Geoscience Australia
- Australasian realm
- Australia-New Guinea
- List of cities in Australia by population
- List of drainage basins of Australia
- List of extreme points of Australia
- List of islands of Australia
- List of lakes of Australia
- List of mountains in Australia
- List of regions of Australia
- List of rivers of Australia
- List of valleys of Australia
- List of waterfalls in Australia
- Protected areas of Australia
