= Alexander Hugh Chisholm =

Australian journalist, newspaper editor, author and amateur ornithologist

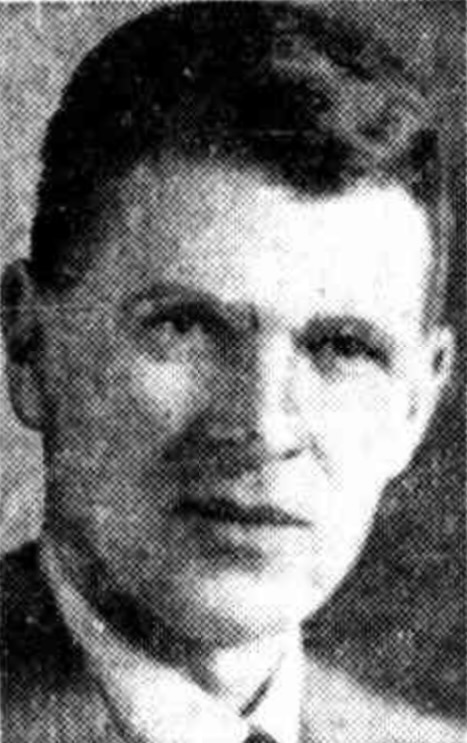
Chisholm in 1932

Alexander Hugh Chisholm OBE FRZS (28 March 1890 — 10 July 1977) also known as Alec Chisholm, was a noted Australian naturalist, journalist, newspaper editor, author and ornithologist. He was a member of the Royal Australasian Ornithologists Union (RAOU), President of the RAOU 1939–1940, and editor of its journal the Emu from 1926 to 1928. In 1941 he was elected a Fellow of the RAOU in 1941 and the previous year he had been the first recipient of the Australian Natural History Medallion for his work in ornithology and popularising natural history. Chisholm was a prolific and popular writer of articles and books, mainly on birds and nature but also on history, literature and biography.

== Early life ==
Alec H. Chisholm was born on 28 March 1890 at Maryborough, Victoria, seventh of eight children. His father was Colin Chisholm, an Australian-born grocer, and his wife Charlotte, née Kennedy, from Scotland. He was educated at Maryborough State School until the age of 12.

== Conservationist ==
By the time he began work as a journalist, Chisholm already had a name as a conservationist. In 1907, aged seventeen, he joined the Royal Australasian Ornithologists Union and during the next year wrote six articles in the organisation's journal, the Emu. In the Maryborough and Dunolly Advertiser he campaigned in 1908 against the killing of egrets for feathers for women's hats, a crusade in which he won support from Australian poet Dame Mary Gilmore. In 1911 he was employed at the newspaper as a journalist, leaving in 1915 for a position at the Brisbane Mail. He continued to campaign for the conservation of Australia's birds, animals and plants for the rest of his life.

== Personal life ==
On 8 November 1923 Chisholm married Olive May Haseler in Brisbane. They had one daughter, Deirdre, who was born on 26 December 1924. From 1964, Olive Chisholm's health deteriorated seriously. Chisholm cared for her as best he could until late 1968, when she was committed to Balmoral Hill Convalescent Home, where she died in 1970. By this time, his own health was in serious decline, although he continued living alone in a small flat in Sydney's Cremorne Point until his death in 1977.

== Journalist and editor ==
Chisholm worked as a journalist in Queensland from 1915 to 1922, then moved to Sydney, where he became news editor of the Daily Telegraph and later editor of the Sunday Pictorial. After moving to Melbourne in 1933, he was for many years editor of the Australasian, before being appointed editor of The Argus in June 1937. He spent ten years, from 1948 to 1958, editing the ten-volume Australian Encyclopaedia, for which he was awarded the Order of the British Empire. Chisholm was also editor of The Victorian Naturalist and Who's Who in Australia. In his late years he wrote several entries on ornithologists, naturalists and explorers in the Australian Dictionary of Biography. He was a contributor of articles to a number of publications, including Walkabout, the latter mostly on Australian bird life and history.

== Historian ==
Visiting England in 1938, Chisholm discovered a large number of documents relating to the nineteenth-century ornithologist John Gould. They included the diary kept by Gould's principal collector, John Gilbert, during his participation in Ludwig Leichhardt’s 1844-45 expedition to Port Essington. This diary became the foundation of Chisholm's 1941 book, Strange New World. He published several later works of history, but none achieved the popularity or notoriety of his Gilbert and Leichhardt book.

== Awards and offices ==
- 1918–1922 – adviser and lecturer on natural history for the Queensland Government
- 1919–1922 – president, Queensland Gould League of Bird Lovers
- 1920–1922 – president, Queensland Naturalists' Club
- 1920–1922 – editor, Queensland Naturalist
- 1922 – corresponding fellow, American Ornithologists' Union
- 1926–1928 – editor, Emu
- 1934 – president, Royal Zoological Society of New South Wales
- 1937–1938 – president, Victorian Bird Observers' Club
- 1937–1938 – president, Field Naturalists Club of Victoria
- 1939–1940 – president, Royal Australasian Ornithologists Union
- 1939–1948 – editor, The Victorian Naturalist
- 1940 – Australian Natural History Medallion (Field Naturalists Club of Victoria)
- 1940 – inaugural recipient of the Australian Natural History Medallion
- Officer of the Order of the British Empire
- Fellow of the Royal Zoological Society
- Fellow of the Royal Australian Historical Society
- Fellow of the Royal Historical Society of Queensland
- Member of the British Ornithologists' Union

== Books ==
- Chisholm, A. H., The Story of Elizabeth Gould (Melbourne: Hawthorn Press, 1944).
- ————, Strange New World: The Adventures of John Gilbert and Ludwig Leichardt (Sydney: Angus & Robertson, 1955).
- ————, Ferdinand von Mueller (Melbourne: Oxford University Press, 1962).
- ————, Mateship with Birds. Whitcombe & Tombs Ltd: Melbourne.(1922)
- ————, Birds and Green Places. A book of Australian nature gossip. J.M. Dent & Sons Ltd: London.(1929)
- ————, Nature Fantasy in Australia. J.M. Dent & Sons Ltd: London.(1932).
- ————, Bird Wonders of Australia. Angus & Robertson: Sydney. This book went through six editions, the last being issued in 1969.(1934).
- ————, An Explorer and His Birds. John Gilbert's discoveries in 1844-45. Brown, Prior, Anderson: Melbourne.(1945).
- ————, The Making of a Sentimental Bloke : A sketch of the remarkable career of C.J. Dennis, Georgian house: Melbourne.(1946).
- ————, Fairy Wrens. F.W. Cheshire Pty Ltd: Melbourne.(1948).
- ————, News from Nature. A selection of seasonal gossip. Georgian House: Melbourne.(1948).
- ————, Scots Wha Hae : History of the Royal Caledonian Society of Melbourne, Angus & Robertson: Sydney. (1950).
- ————, The Romance of the Lyrebird. Angus & Robertson Pty Ltd: Sydney.(1960).
- ————, The Joy of the Earth. Collins: Sydney.(1969).

== Book sections ==
- Chisholm, A. H., "Gilbert, John (1810?–1845)" in Australian Dictionary of Biography, Douglas Pike, ed., vol. 1 (Melbourne: Melbourne University Press, 1966), pp. 441–442.
- ————, "Bennett, George (1804–1893), medical practitioner and naturalist" in Australian Dictionary of Biography, Douglas Pike, ed., vol. 1 (Melbourne: Melbourne University Press, 1966), pp. 85–86.
- ————, "Gilbert, John (1810?–1845), naturalist and explorer" in Journal of the Royal Australian Historical Society, Douglas Pike, ed., vol. 1 (Melbourne: Melbourne University Press, 1966), pp. 441–442.
- ————, "Gould, Elizabeth (1804–1841), natural history artist" in Australian Dictionary of Biography, Douglas Pike, ed., vol. 1 (Melbourne: Melbourne University Press, 1966), p. 465.
- ————, "Gould, John (1804–1881), zoologist" in Australian Dictionary of Biography, Douglas Pike, ed., vol. 1 (Melbourne: Melbourne University Press, 1966), pp. 465–467.
- ————, "Coxen, Charles (1809–1876), naturalist and politician" in Australian Dictionary of Biography, Douglas Pike, ed., vol. 3 (Melbourne: Melbourne University Press, 1969), pp. 487–488.
- ————, "Calvert, James Snowden (1825–1884), explorer and botanist" in Australian Dictionary of Biography, Douglas Pike, ed., vol. 3 (Melbourne: Melbourne University Press, 1969), p. 333.
- ————, "Broinowski, Gracius Joseph (1837–1913), artist and ornithologist" in Australian Dictionary of Biography, Douglas Pike, ed., vol. 3 (Melbourne: Melbourne University Press, 1969), p. 239.
- ————, "Atkinson, Caroline Louisa Waring (1834–1872), naturalist and writer" in Australian Dictionary of Biography, Douglas Pike, ed., vol. 3 (Melbourne: Melbourne University Press, 1969), pp. 59–60.
- ————, "Helms, Richard (1842–1914), zoologist and botanist" in Australian Dictionary of Biography, Douglas Pike, ed., vol. 4 (Melbourne: Melbourne University Press, 1972), p. 374.
- ————, "Elsey, Joseph Ravenscroft (1834–1857), surgeon, explorer and naturalist" in Australian Dictionary of Biography, Douglas Pike, ed., vol. 4 (Melbourne: Melbourne University Press, 1972), p. 139.
- ————, "Ramsay, Edward Pierson (1842–1916), ornithologist and zoologist" in Australian Dictionary of Biography, Bede Nairn, ed., vol. 6 (Melbourne: Melbourne University Press, 1976), pp. 3–4.
- ————, "Wheelwright, Horace (Horatio) William (1815–1865)" in Australian Dictionary of Biography, Bede Nairn, ed., vol. 6 (Melbourne: Melbourne University Press, 1976), pp. 383–384.
- ————, "Barrett, Charles Leslie (1879–1959), naturalist and journalist" in Australian Dictionary of Biography, Bede Nairn and Geoffrey Serle, eds, vol. 7 (Melbourne: Melbourne University Press, 1979), p. 185.
- ————, "Cayley, Neville William (1886–1950), ornithologist and artist" in Australian Dictionary of Biography, Bede Nairn and Geoffrey Serle, eds, vol. 7 (Melbourne: Melbourne University Press, 1979), pp. 596–597.
- Kloot, Tess, "Chisholm, Alexander Hugh (1890–1977), Journalist, Ornithologist and Encyclopaedist" in Australian Dictionary of Biography, John Ritchie, ed., vol. 13 (Melbourne: Melbourne University Press, 1993), pp. 422–423.

== Edited books ==
- Chisholm, A. H. ed., Journal of a Voyage to New South Wales with Sixty-five Plates of New Descript Animals, Birds, Lizards, Serpents, Curious Cones of Trees and other Natural Productions by John White, Esq. (Sydney: Angus & Robertson for Royal Australian Historical Society, 1962).

== Journal articles ==
- Balmford, Peter, "Newspapers as a Source of Information about Natural History", Victorian Naturalist, 102 (1) (1985), 20–27.
- Chisholm, A. H., "The Ornithological History of Queensland", Queensland Naturalist, lii (1922), 66–79; 93–101; 115–123.
- ————, "Some Letters from George Grey to John Gould", Emu, 38 (1938).
- ————, "John Gilbert. Some Letters to Gould", Emu, 38 (1938).
- ————, "The Story of John Gilbert.", Emu, 39 (1940), 156–176.
- ————, "Mrs John Gould and her Relations", Emu (1941).
- ————, "John Gould's Australian Prospectus", Emu, 42 (1942), 74–84.
- ————, "Birds of the Gilbert Diary", Emu, 44 (1944), 131–150.
- ————, "An Explorer and His Birds. John Gilbert"s Discoveries in 1844–5" (1945).
- ————, "The Diaries of S. W. Jackson", Emu, 58 (1958), 75–76.
- ————, "J. R. Elsey, Surgeon, Naturalist, Explorer", Queensland Naturalist, 17 (3/4) (1964), 60–70.
- ————, "Some Early Letters in Australian Ornithology", Emu, 63 (1964).
- ————, "J. R. Elsey, Explorer of the Never-Never", Journal of the Royal Australian Historical Society, 52 (1966).
- ————, "Dudley Dickison - Student of Birds and Books", Victorian Naturalist, 84 (8) (1967), 251–253.
- ————, "Obituary. Gilbert Roscoe Gannon", Proceedings of the Royal Zoological Society of New South Wales, 89 (1968), 12.
- ————, "Obituaries: Roy Percy Cooper", Emu, 77 (2) (1977), 88.

== Journal articles about Alexander Chisholm ==
- McGill, A. R., "Alexander Hugh Chisholm", Emu, 77 (1977), 232–235.
- Willis, J. H., "Alexander Hugh Chisholm, OBE, CMZS., C.F.A.O.U. (1890–1977). An Appreciation", Victorian Naturalist, 94 (5) (1977), 188–190.
