= Ivan Bede Jose =

Chinese-born Australian surgeon

Sir Ivan Bede Jose (13 February 1893 in Ningbo, China – 23 November 1969 in North Adelaide, South Australia, Australia) was a Chinese-born Australian surgeon, president of Royal Australasian College of Surgeons in 1955–1957 and chairman of the Australian Red Cross Society in 1966–1968

He served in the Australian Army Medical Corps in WWI and was awarded a Military Cross.

== Family ==
His father was George Jose and he had two brothers, Wilfrid (commonly misspelled Wilfred), a soldier, and Gilbert Jose, a cricketer and soldier. He also had a son, Robert Jose, who lived in North Adelaide, South Australia, until he died in 2020.
