= George Jose =

George Herbert Jose (15 December 1868 – 26 November 1956) was a canon of St Peter's Cathedral, Adelaide, Australia, archdeacon of Mount Gambier and Dean of Adelaide.

== Early life ==
Born at Bristol, UK, he was the brother of Arthur Wilberforce Jose. He was educated at Clifton College.

He left England for Australia in 1888 and after marrying Clara Ellen Sturt (d.1925) in 1890, they went together to China in 1891 where Jose worked as a lay CMS missionary until 1899.

In 1900 Jose won a Davis Chinese Scholarship to Oxford University. He attended Worcester College, Oxford where he obtained his BA in 1903 and was awarded his MA in 1906.

== Clerical career ==
After ordination in England and curacies at Gloucester and Oxford he and his wife went to Adelaide in South Australia in 1903 where he took charge of St Cyprian's, Lower North Adelaide. 1905 he took charge of St Peter's Church for one year. In 1906 he was appointed as rector of Christ Church, North Adelaide where he has several altar boys under him. He was appointed a Canon of Adelaide in 1918 and Archdeacon of Adelaide in 1929. He resigned the incumbency of Christ Church in 1933. He then became Dean of Adelaide until his retirement in 1953.

During World War I, Jose was Chaplain to the Australian Military Forces including Deputy Senior Chaplain 1916–18. His son Wilfred was killed in action in France but another son Ivan Bede Jose was awarded the Military Cross. A third son, Gilbert Jose, who was killed in World War II.

Jose died in Adelaide.

== Publications ==
Jose compiled a three-volume history of The Church of England in South Australia (1937, 1954, 1955); his other writings included Annals of Christ Church (1921) and The Story of Jesus Christ (1930).
