= Pilbara freshwater ecoregion =

Ecoregion in Western Australia

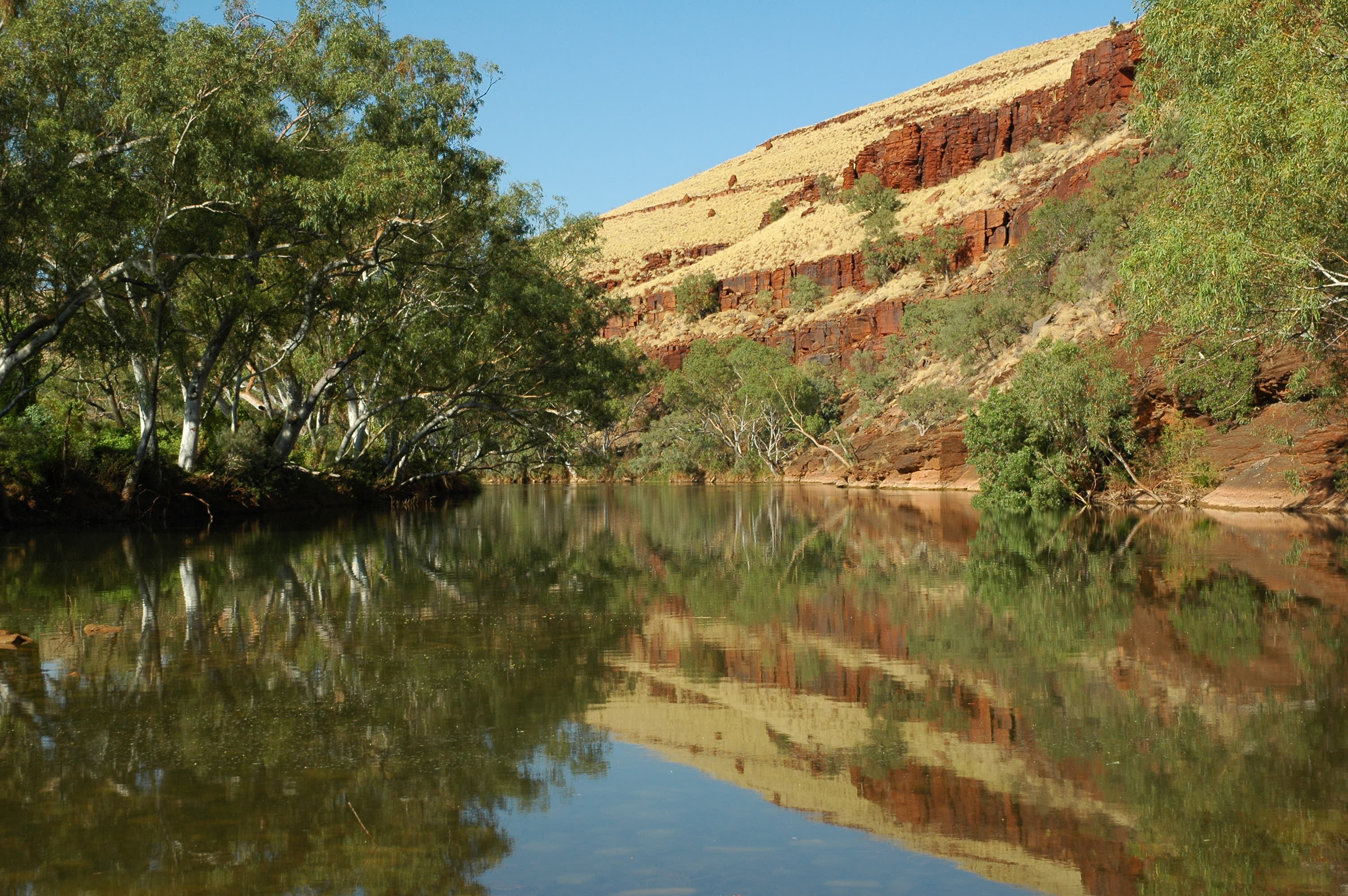
Billabong in Millstream Chichester National Park, in the Fortescue River watershed

The Pilbara freshwater ecoregion is a freshwater ecoregion in Australia. It includes several river basins in semi-arid northwestern Western Australia.

== Geography ==
The ecoregion includes, from south to north, the drainages of the Greenough, Murchison, Gascoyne, Ashburton, Fortescue, and De Grey rivers. These rivers drain Western Australia's Pilbara and Gascoyne regions.

The climate of the ecoregion is tropical and semi-arid. Most of the rivers are intermittent (or ephemeral). The ecoregion has rugged terrain, underlain by ancient Precambrian blocks. Most of the ecoregion is over 200 metres in elevation, and the highest elevation is Mount Meharry at 1,253 metres elevation. Many of the rivers have carved deep canyons as they drain towards the Indian Ocean. During extended dry periods the rivers are reduced to shallow pools in protected canyons.

The ecoregion adjoins the Great Sandy Desert to the north and east. It adjoins Southwestern Australia to the south, which has a more temperate and moist climate, with more year-round rivers.

There are extensive cave systems on the North West Cape, with subterranean brackish water habitats hosting unique aquatic communities.

The ecoregion corresponds to the Indian Ocean drainage division and mostly corresponds to Pilbara–Gascoyne Level 1 drainage basin as defined in Australia's National Catchment Boundaries (NCB) system, although Pilbara–Gascoyne excludes the De Grey River.

== Fauna ==
The fish fauna includes both species widespread through Australia and species endemic to the ecoregion. 20 fish species are native to the ecoregion, of which 5, or 25%, are endemic. Widespread species include the bony bream (Nematalosa erebi), Hyrtl's catfish (Neosilurus hyrtlii), banded grunter (Amniataba percoides), and spangled perch (Leiopotherapon unicolor).

Endemic freshwater species include the Murchison River hardyhead (Craterocephalus cuneiceps) and golden gudgeon (Hypseleotris aurea), which are found in the rivers from the Gascoyne south, and the Fortescue grunter (Leiopotherapon aheneus), which is found in the Fortescue and Ashburton rivers.

The blind gudgeon (Milyeringa veritas) and blind cave eel (Ophisternon candidum) are endemic to brackish-water caves on the North West Cape.
