= Australian south-east coast drainage division =

Area of southern Australia

Approximate location of the drainage division

The south-east coast drainage division is the very long, narrow area of southern Australia between the Great Dividing Range and the Coral and Tasman seas, and the Bass Strait. It includes the small part of south-eastern South Australia which lies to the east of the Murray–Darling basin, and all of coastal Victoria and coastal New South Wales. While the southern, eastern, and western boundaries are clearly defined by geography, the northern boundary is arbitrarily defined as the New South Wales – Queensland border. The distinguishing feature of the drainage basin is the Great Dividing Range and the associated Australian Alps.

== Major rivers ==
Major rivers of the division, from north to south, then east to west include the Clarence, Macleay, Hunter, Hawkesbury-Nepean, Shoalhaven, Clyde, Snowy, La Trobe, Hopkins, and Glenelg rivers.

== Catchment areas ==
For administrative purposes, within the drainage division, the basins are generally classified into the following catchments, from north to south, then east to west:

- Northern Rivers catchment
- Hunter-Central Rivers catchment
- Sydney Basin
- Southern Rivers catchment
- East Gippsland catchment
- West Gippsland catchment
- Westernport and Port Phillip catchments
- Corangamite catchment
- Glenelg-Hopkins catchment
