= Western Plateau =

Australian drainage region

The Western Plateau is Australia's largest drainage division and is composed predominantly of the remains of the ancient rock shield of Gondwana. It covers two thirds of the continent; 2,700,000 square kilometres (1,000,000 sq mi) of arid land, including large parts of Western Australia, South Australia, and the Northern Territory. For comparison, it is roughly the same size as the whole of continental Europe from Western Poland to Portugal.

The western plateau extends from the Gulf of Carpentaria to Onslow, covering the cities of Perth and Albany. The Western Plateau occupies almost two-thirds of the land surface of Australia and it covers parts of Western Australia, Northern Territory and South Australia

Rain rarely falls in this region and aside from a handful of permanent waterholes, surface water is absent at all times except after heavy rain. Most of the territory is flat sandy or stony desert with a sparse covering of shrubs or tussock grasses. Average rainfall varies from one area to another and is quoted at 189 millimetres (7.4 in) to 398 millimetres (15.7 in) per year, but is highly unpredictable.

A reason why few people live on the Western Plateau is due to the dry climate and the cold Antarctic winds blowing during the summer and steady rain falls during the winter.

== See also ==
- Australian Shield
- Great Victoria Desert
- Pilbara Craton
- Yilgarn craton
