= Geology of New South Wales =

Geologically the Australian state of New South Wales consists of seven main regions: Lachlan Fold Belt, the Hunter–Bowen orogeny or New England Orogen (NEO), the Delamerian Orogeny, the Clarence Moreton Basin, the Great Artesian Basin, the Sydney Basin, and the Murray Basin.

There are a few other sedimentary basins, the Great Artesian Basin can be broken into the Eromanga Basin in the west and the Surat Basin to the east. The Sydney Basin extends north into the Gunnedah Basin, which goes even further north into the Bowen Basin which extends into Queensland, under the Surat Basin. The New England Orogen has a few small Basins included, such as the Lorne Basin, the Myall Syncline, and Gloucester Basin. The Oaklands Basin is in the south of the state under the Murray Basin. The Darling Basin is in the state's west, but mostly covered by the Murray Basin. Gilgandra Sub-Basin and Paka Tank Trough are potential places for coal and gas.

New South Wales is home to some important mining operations including Broken Hill and coal mining and burning in the Hunter and Illawarra.

== Lachlan Fold Belt ==
Rocks from the Lachlan Fold Belt are exposed through the south east and central parts of NSW, and underlie the Great Artesian Basin and the Sydney and Murray Basins at depth. The region is currently 1000 km wide, but was originally 2000 to 3000 km. The Lachlan Fold Belt was formed in the Middle Paleozoic from 450 to 340 Mya. It lies on a basement of Cambrian oceanic floor, however, most of this has been subducted leaving the sediment veneer scraped off in chevron folds. It was compressed as the Pacific plate subducted beneath the Australian continent margin. Over time the hinge point, at which the ocean bed was bent down, changed to be more out to the east, and additional ocean bed sediment was added to the continent. This also means that there is a failed subduction zone extending through New South Wales.

The Australian Capital Territory is embedded in New South Wales in the Lachlan Fold Belt. The Narooma terrane is another terrane abutted on the southeast corner of New South Wales which can be considered as a component of the Lachlan Fold Belt.

== Hunter–Bowen orogeny ==
The Hunter–Bowen orogeny also known as the New England Orogen contains rocks from Late Paleozoic to early Mesozoic times. It was formed as an arc-forearc zone as the Pacific Plate was subducted to the west.

== Darling and Barka Basins ==
The Darling Basin formed in the very early Devonian. Stretching the crust led to the formation of basins such as the Cobar Basin, Mount Hope Trough, Melrose Trough and Rast Trough. Where stretching was less, shelves were formed instead: Kopyje Shelf, Mouramba Shelf, Walters Range Shelf and Winduck Shelf. The Cobar Supergroup is the term used for the infill in these shelves and troughs which consisted of sediment and volcanics.

The deeper basins included turbidites. Felsic volcanic material was also erupted in the Rast and Mount Hope Troughs. The Florida, Babinda, Majuba and Mineral Hill Volcanics are found on the East side of the Kopyje Shelf. Most of the sediment however is quartz sand.

Subsequently in the early Devonian the basin content was pushed back up, and the Mulga Downs Group was deposited by rivers up until the Carboniferous Period. This formed the Barka Basin. Rock from this group is mostly quartz sandstone, with a small amount of siltstone.

== Sydney Basin ==
The Sydney Basin consists of Permian and Triassic sedimentary rocks stretching from Newcastle to Batemans Bay. The land component covers 44000 km^{2}, but there is another 5000 km^{2} underwater on the continental shelf. The basement consists of the Lachlan Fold Belt, and the New England Fold Belt is found to the north across the Hunter Thrust. It is a foreland basin, likely to be formed by compression loading.

The first rocks formed in the Permian were the Dalwood Group and lower Shoalhaven Group. Material for this came from basaltic volcanoes to the north in the Hunter region. The Greta Coal Measures then formed in the north side in an alluvial fan from the mountains of the New England Orogen. The basin sank lower and sea water came much further inland, covering the Permian sediments and the basement further west, and the Maitland Group and upper Shoalhaven Group were deposited. The Muree/Nowra Sandstone formed in the centre of the basin.

In the next stage the Hunter – Bowen Orogeny cause faulting and folding on the north side of the basin. In the Late Permian river and delta deposition formed the Tomago and Whittingham Coal Measures in the north. But deepening seawater formed the Kulnura Marine Tongue and Bulga Formation. In the southern part of the basin a delta formed the lower Illawarra Coal Measures. The Erins Vale Formation interrupts this. Marine transgression formed Dempsey Formation, Denman Formation, Bargo Claystone, and Ball Bone Formation. Beach deposition then formed Waratah/Watts Sandstone and the Darkes Forest Sandstone and Angus Place Sandstone. Over the beach land formed again with the Newcastle and Wollombi Coal Measures in the north, and upper Illawarra Coal Measures in the south. Early in the Triassic the New England Fold Belt was uplifted and an alluvial flood plain formed the Narrabeen group. The Bald Hill Claystone, which is a redbed containing laterite was formed by weathering of the Gerringong Volcanics.

The Hawkesbury sandstone is the prominent rock found in Sydney, and also forming the top of escarpments in the area, such as the Illawarra escarpment. This is overlain by the fine sandstone of the Mittagong Formation and the Wianamatta shale.

The basin was later buried under 1 to 4 km of Jurassic and Cretaceous sediments. The Tasman Sea formed by rifting and underplating of the basin may have happened in Aptian times. This resulted in the upper sediment being completely eroded off.

== Great Artesian Basin ==
Part of the Great Artesian Basin is along the northern border of New South Wales and also extends north into Queensland. This is also known as Surat Basin. It occupies one fifth of the state of New South Wales. The eastern border extends from Bebo to Narrabri to Murrurundi to Dunedoo to Narromine. The basin was formed in the Jurassic and Cretaceous periods.

The oldest Jurassic rocks in the basin are found in the northeast near the Queensland border. They are called Precipice Sandstone, Evergreen Shale and Boxvale Sandstone, Hutton Sandstone from Pliensbachian to Aalenian in age. In the south east of the basin these deposits are known as Purlawaugh Formation which are aged between Pliensbachian to Bathonian. The northern parts are then covered with coal and shale from the Injune Creek Group. In the east they are covered with quartz sand, at the point where run off entered the basin called Blythesdale Group between Tithonian and Barremian or Pillaga Sandstone which is now known as Pilliga Sandstone.

In the Cretaceous sea water entered and deposited shale from the Rolling Downs Group which also contains some calcareous sandstone. Continental sediment also occasionally show in the Cretaceous.

Most of the basin is covered by alluvium and lake deposits from the Cainozoic period, and this deposition continues till this day.

Because the basin is an important site for artesian wells, it has been extensively drilled and much is known about the structure of the basement and geothermal temperature gradients. Prominent subsurface features are the Coonamble lobe of the Surat Basin, round around Moree and Coonamble. The Culgoa Ridge is underlain by metamorphic rocks, and is near Brewarrina. The Lila Trough is north of Bourke. The Eulo Shelf is underlain by granite and is southeast of Hungerford. The Bulloo Embayment north of White Cliffs is over 300 m deep and is disrupted on its west side by the Warratta Fault. The Quinyamble Trough extends in from South Australia.

== Clarence Moreton Basin ==
The Clarence Moreton Basin is in the far north east of the state around Lismore and Grafton, the basin extends into southern Queensland. It formed by oblique extension of the underlying Paleozoic New England Orogen basement. It consists of continental deposits, starting with a small amount of Triassic volcanic rocks and sedimentary sequences including coal beds, and then mostly Jurassic and Cretaceous sedimentary rocks. The basin covers 16000 square kilometers. The basin was named when the Clarence Basin (named after the Clarence River and Moreton Basin in Queensland were proved to be one structure.

The first rocks in the Clarence Moreton Basin of New South Wales are the Chillingham Volcanics. These are from some time in the Triassic period, and for a band north and south of Chillingham. They consist of conglomerate at the base, Rhyolite, lithic rhyolitic tuff, and shale. The Nymboida Coal measures extend from Nymboida to Kangaroo Creek. They consist of lithic sandstones (wackes, minor arenites), siltstone, polymictic conglomerate, coal, rhyolitic tuff, and basalt. The total thickness is over 1000 meters. The outcrop is 90 square kilometers, and it forms a north west trending band 29 km long on the southwest tip of the basin. Fossils reveal a date of middle Triassic. A lower part is called Cloughers Creek Formation. The Basin Creek Formation includes the coal mined at Nymboida. The Bardool Conglomerate forming a 180 m thick layer, is also a unit in the coal measures. The conglomerate includes a 15 m thick layer of basalt exposed at Copes Creek.

The Red Cliff Coal Measures are from late Triassic. It forms a belt 2.5 km wide and 19 km long from Buchanans Head trough Red Cliff. The Evans Head Coal measure are correlated with these, but are further up the north coast at Evans Head.

The basin was next uplifted and eroded and then deepened considerably and Bundamba group rocks form a complete V shape on both sides of the basin. In the northern parts the rock is mostly friable sandstone, but in the south it is divided into conglomerate below and siltstone above. The Laytons Range Conglomerate rests on the basin floor and extends from Baryulgil, to Nymboida. The conglomerate often appears as a cliff. The Corindi Conglomerate is a local name for a hailstone sized gravel near Corindi. The Mill Creek Siltstone. are often olive green or yellow-brown with bright red joint planes.

The Marburg subgroup extends for 225 km along the western side of the basin into Queensland from Corindi. It is mostly clay cemented cross bedded quartz sandstone, but this is interbedded with claystone and shale. At the base is the Blaxland Fossil Wood Conglomerate Member at Blaxlands Creek. The fossil wood is in the form of horizontal tree trunks up to 18 m long and 600 mm diameter. The fossilization process replaced the wood with limonite and hematite. The Towallum Basalt is a 15-meter thick layer near Nymboida, Glenreagh and Moleton trig station overlying the Marburg formation. The Walloon Coal Measures forms a U shape around the east, south and west sides of the basin. It consists of claystone, shale, siltstone, arenites, and coal seams and the plant fossils in it show a Jurassic age.

The next layer of rocks in the basin forming a nested U shape in its exposure is the Kangaroo Creek Sandstone. This sandstone has saccharoidal texture, and glistens white and cream. This is not due to angular sand grains, but results from silica crystallization. It is up to 150 m thick.

The Grafton Formation is the sedimentary unit in the geographical centre of the basin. It is the youngest of the beds being between Late Jurassic and early Cretaceous. It occurs from Grafton to Casino consisting of soft sandstone, siltstone and claystone. Dolerite has intruded this at Glenugie Peak, and near Banyabba.

During the Cainozoic, rifting along the east coast of Australia commenced and uplifted the eastern side of the Clarence Moreton Basin. This resulted in the splitting off of the Lord Howe Rise and the opening of the ocean floor.

== Murray basin ==
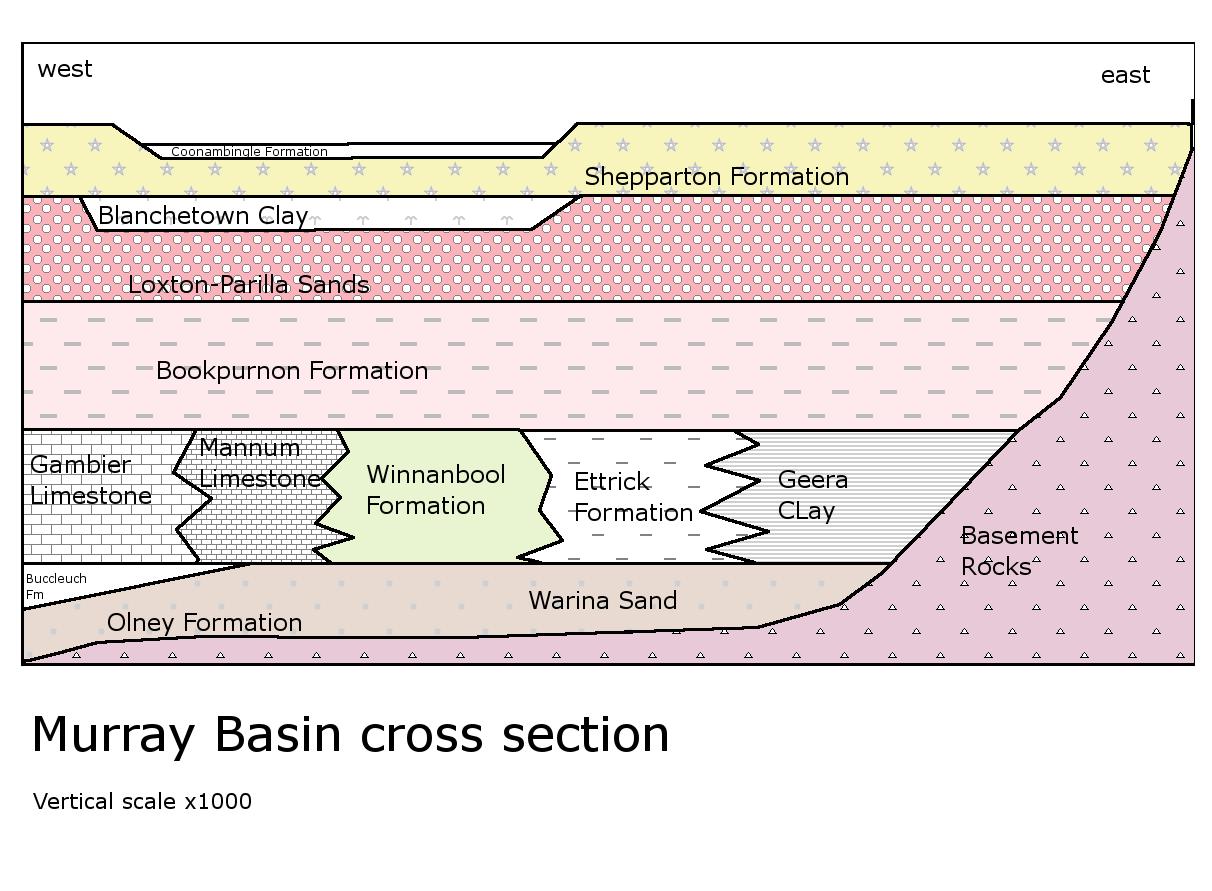

After Australia separated from Antarctica the Murray basin was formed. The basin floor only subsided slowly over time. The basin became filled with up to 600 m of sediments during the Cenozoic.

From Paleocene to Eocene the western side was flooded with sea water and deposited the Warina sand. The sea withdrew and later in the Eocene silt and clay of the Olney Formation were deposited. One minor sea incursion resulted in late Eocene resulted in the Buccleuch Formation in South Australia. This group of deposits is termed the Renmark Group and was earlier known as Knight Group.

The sea level rose again in Late Oligocene to mid Miocene forming the Murray Group of sediments, with marl and limestone in the deeper locations, and the Geera Clay in the shallow waters. The rock units formed in the deeper water included the Ettric Formation, the Winnanbool Formation and the Mannum Formation limestone with Gambier Limestone in South Australia. When sea level fell again in mid Miocene the deposited Geera clay and Olney Formation moved westward over the limestone.

During Upper Miocene to Pliocene the sea rose and fell several times. The first sea rise formed the Murravian Gulf and resulted in clay and marl in the west called the Bookpurnong Formation, and Calivil Formation river and lake sand in the east. When the sea retreated in Early Pliocene, the Loxton Sands also informally known as Loxton-Parilla Sands were formed on the beach on the shore of the emergent land. Locally heavy minerals have been concentrated by wave action including rutile zircon and ilmenite forming economic mining opportunities.

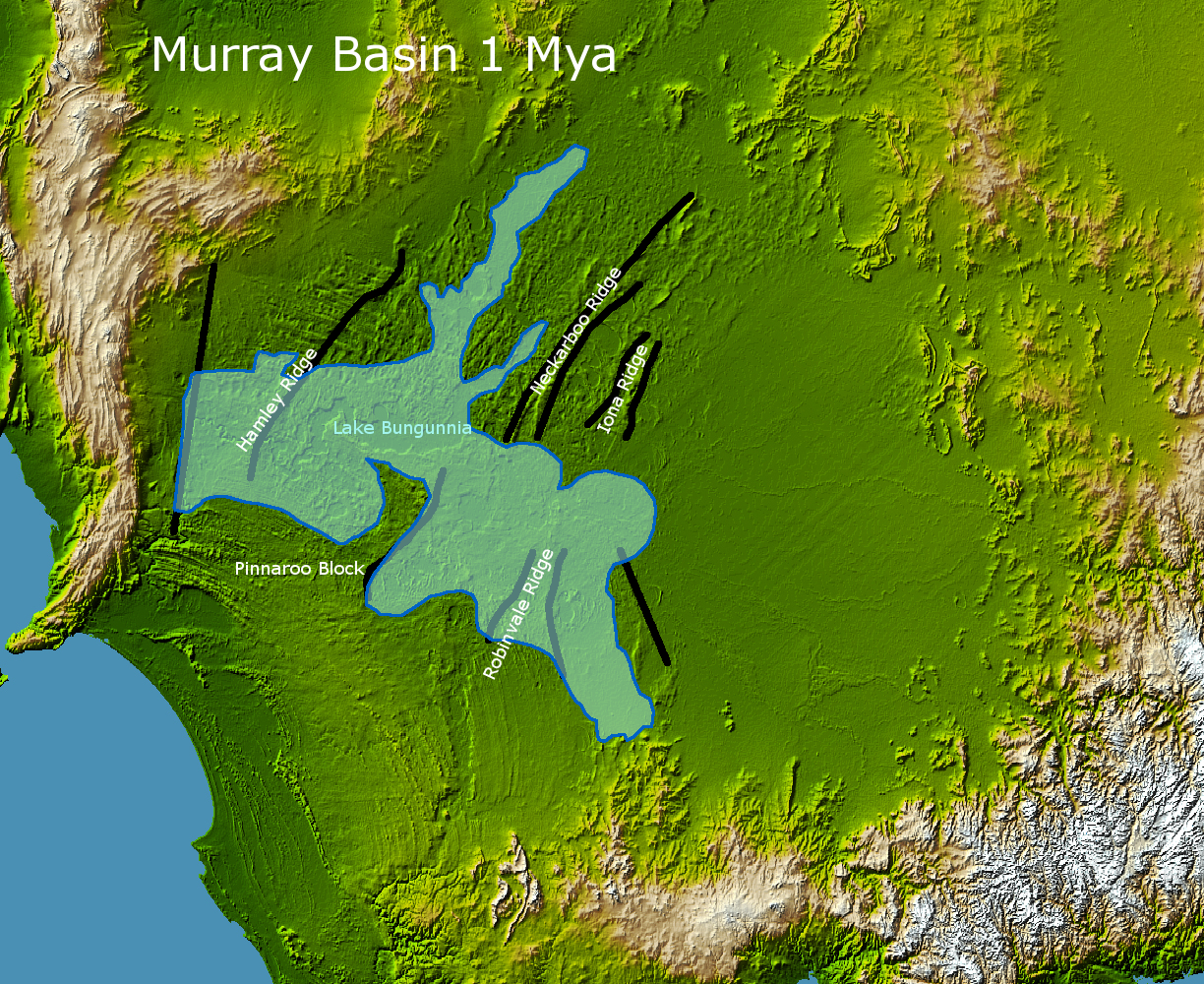
Lake Bungunnia around 1Mya

The Murray River became dammed by uplift of over 250 meters in the Grampians in Victoria during the Pleistocene about 2.5 Mya. The dam formed Lake Bungunnia, which reached 40000 km^{2} and deposited the Blanchetown Clay therein. Higher rainfall of at least 500 mm per year kept the lake filled at first, but during later times rainfall was insufficient and saline lakes formed, depositing dolomite. Even today some saline lakes remain as a remnant of the vast lake. The Murray River carved out a new path to the sea via Murray Bridge replacing its previous exit at Portland, Victoria. The lake was gone by about 0.7 Mya.

The Pooraka Formation formed in the north west due to increased erosion resulting in colluvium depositing. The colluvium forms fans, cones and scree slopes, and often contains clay and breccia. In the flat areas the Shepparton Formation also resulted from river deposits of floodplain clay.

Most of the existing surface dates from Quaternary period. The river deposits from the east have been progressively overlaying the marine deposits further west, as the shore line receded. Within the Pleistocene deposits are three layers of sand that are aquifers, deposited during higher rainfall periods of the interglacials. The floodplain deposits from the current rivers are the Coonambidgal Formation, however this term is used informally for the older Pleistocene flood deposits as well. During the dryer glacial periods the area was arid.

== Oaklands basin ==
The Oaklands Basin covers approximately 3 800 square kilometres in the Riverina district of southern New South Wales, between the towns of Mulwala, Jerilderie, Griffith, Coleambly, Oaklands and Albury. This Permo-Triassic basin trends north-northwest-south-southeast and is concealed beneath the south-eastern portion of the Murray Basin. The basin overlies the Ovens Graben (Ovens Valley Graben in Victoria) which extends from the Murrumbidgee River west of Darlington Point in New South Wales to Wangaratta in Victoria. It is approximately 25 km wide at Oaklands and approximately 15 km wide at its northern extent. The Oaklands Basin hosts to more than 1000 m thick sediments. The basin was first discovered in 1916 when water drillers discovered coal near Coorabin. Coal has been the main focus for exploration within the basin since this time. Extensive coal exploration drilling has been undertaken, mostly in the Coorabin area. In addition two coal drilling programs by the NSW Department of Industry, designed to help define the limits of the basin, have resulted in wide-spaced drilling coverage over most of the basin. Petroleum exploration within the basin has been minimal, consisting of a small number of geophysical surveys and two stratigraphic wells. In 2009 four new lines of high quality 2D seismic have been acquired by DTIRIS (formerly the NSW Department of Industry and Investment). This survey has further delineated the boundaries of the basin, established the thickness of the sediment fill and imaged the structures of the Ovens Valley Graben along the margin and central portion of the basin.

== Volcanic rocks ==
New South Wales has 26,000 km^{2} of volcanic rocks from Cainozoic period. In the north east major outcrops of volcanic rocks are found between Warialda to Glen Innes and south to Armidale, the Liverpool Range, Barrington Tops, Nandewar Range near Narrabri, the Warrumbungles, and the Tweed Volcano.

== Geological history ==
In the Cambrian and earlier period only the far west of New South Wales existed in its present form. It was joined to what is now Western North America in the Rodinia supercontinent. North America was detached opening up the Pacific Ocean. In the Ordovician period, sediment deposited on the newly formed sea floor, and in the Silurian a back arc basin behind a chain of volcanoes was formed and then accreted back onto the east coast of Australia to form the Lachlan Fold Belt. The main structure in this is north-south, and this is reflected nowadays with the orientation of rivers and mountain ranges.

=== Fossils ===
Collecting fossils is legal in New South Wales under the New South Wales Mining Act with ownership applying to the land owner. Opalised fossils about 100 Mya occur at Lightning Ridge. The Wellington Caves contain megafauna fossils from 4 Mya to 30,000 years old. These include the marsupial lion and giant kangaroo.

At Canowindra is the most important fish fossil site in the world. It dates from 360 Mya in the Devonian and includes Groenlandaspis, Canowindra grossi, Remigolepis walkeri and Bothriolepis yeungae. A museum is there called Age of Fishes Museum. At Cuddie Springs is a fossil site containing Diprotodon and the Thunder Bird.

The Griman Creek Formation contains Cretaceous dinosaur fossils.

== Economic geology ==
=== Mining ===
A variety of mines occur in New South Wales, including Broken Hill Ore Deposit the world's richest zinc and silver mine; Bowdens Silver Deposits near Mudgee; Cadia-Ridgeway Mine 20 km south of Orange; Lake Cowal Campaign and Barrick Gold 125 km sw of Parkes; CSA Mine near Cobar mines copper; Endeavour Mine extracts zinc, is 43 km nw of Cobar; Ginko Mineral Sand Deposit is 30 km west of Pooncarie; Murrawombie Mine; Hillgrove Gold Mine 23 km east of Armidale; Mineral Hill 67 km NNW of Condobolin; Northparkes is 26 km north of Parkes mining copper; Peak Gold Mine 8 km southeast of Cobar; Peak Hill Gold Mine 50 km north of Parkes; Prungle Mineral Sand Project 50 km north east of Euston; Tritton 18 km north of Hermidale; Twelve Mile Mineral Sand Project 40 km east of Pooncarie.

=== Disasters ===
The oldest coal seam fire in the world has been burning for 6000 years at Burning Mountain near Wingen, New South Wales.

The Newcastle earthquake killed 13 people on 28 December 1989.

== History ==
=== Study ===
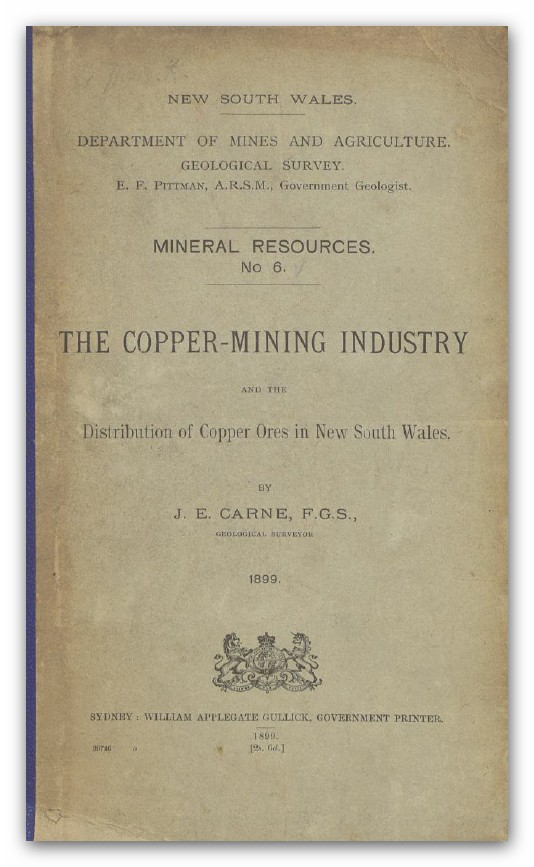
New South Wales Department of Mines and Agriculture The Copper-Mining Industry of New South Wales 1899

=== Government ===
The Department of Mines commenced in late 1874, and the Geological Survey of New South Wales was brought into existence on 1 January 1875. Charles Smith Wilkinson was its first supervisor. In the 1950s to 1970s the administering body for mines was the New South Wales Department of Mines or New South Wales Department of Mines and Agriculture. Before 2004 New South Wales Department of Mineral Resource After 2004 until July 2009 mining in New South Wales was administered by the New South Wales Department of Primary Industries. and then New South Wales Department of Industry & Investment.
