= Deniliquin multiple-ring feature =

Buried feature in south-east Australia, suggested to be an impact structure

Deniliquin
- Coordinates: 35°32′0″S 144°58′0″E
- Country: Australia
- State: New South Wales

The Deniliquin multiple-ring feature is a distinct deeply buried structure in south-east Australia. It is named after the town of Deniliquin. Its characteristics suggest that it is associated with an asteroid impact structure of diameter 520 km (320 mi), which would make it the largest one on Earth, exceeding the largest verified one, the Vredefort impact structure of about 300 km (190 mi) in diameter.

== Background ==
The geological character of Australia, including volcanic and sedimentary cover of Precambrian cratons helped the preservation of a large number of exposed and buried circular features, both of volcanic and impact origin. As of 2018, there were 38 confirmed impact structures and still more of them are likely to be classified as impact ones. To make a determination, field work is required, including drilling. The existence of the Deniliquin circular structure was proposed by Anthony Yeates somewhere between 1995 and 2000, based upon the magnetic patterns in the area.

== Description ==
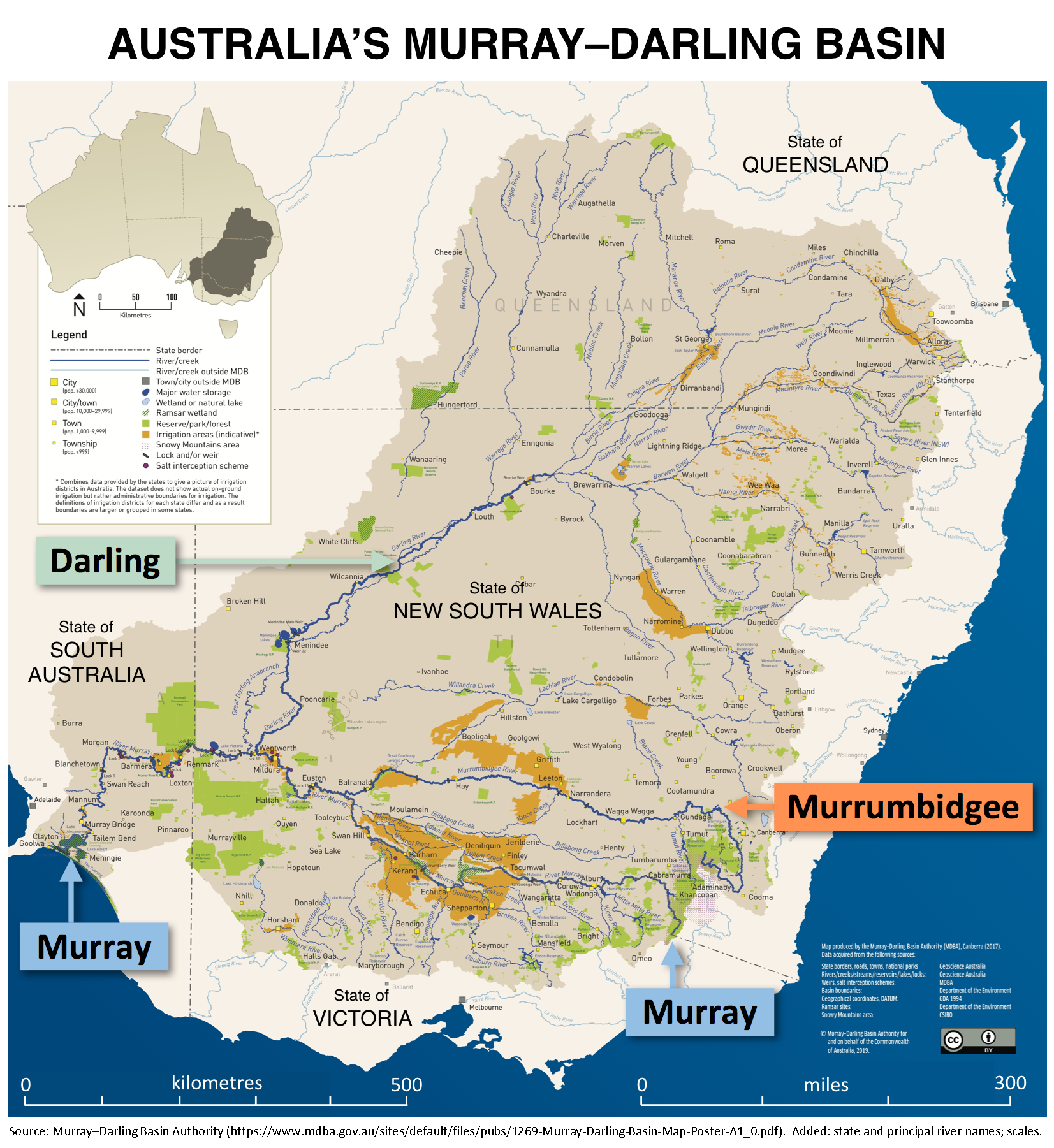
Murray–Darling drainage Basin (Deniliquin is in the larger brown area)

The Deniliquin feature is located beneath the Murray Sedimentary Basin and partly beneath the Darling Sedimentary Basin, and centered about 32 km (20 mi) northwest of Deniliquin. The principal features of the Deniliquin structure are a multiple ring total magnetic intensity (TMI) pattern with the minimal TMI ring radius of 260 km (160 mi); a central quiet magnetic zone; circular Bouguer gravity patterns; an underlying mantle Moho rise about 10 km (6.2 mi) shallower than under the adjacent Tasman orogenic zone; and radial faults associated with magnetic and demagnetized anomalies. The above features suggest that the Deniliquin feature is a root zone of a large impact structure, a multi-ring impact basin. Its existence was proposed by Anthony Yeates somewhere between 1995 and 2000, based upon the magnetic patterns in the area. A 2022 paper by Glikson and Yeates further supports this suggestion based on recent geophysical data, drill-hole samples and airborne magnetic data. As of 2023, most evidence comes from the surface data. Further confirmation of the suggestion would require further deep drilling.

== Dating ==
Its age is estimated between 514±5 Ma and 427–417 Ma. It was likely located in eastern Gondwana before it split off Australia. Glikson suggests that it could have triggered the c. 1.4-million-year-long Late Ordovician (Hirnantian) glaciation and the corresponding mass extinction event (445.2 and 443.8 Ma), which eliminated about 85% of species.

== See also ==
- List of impact structures on Earth
