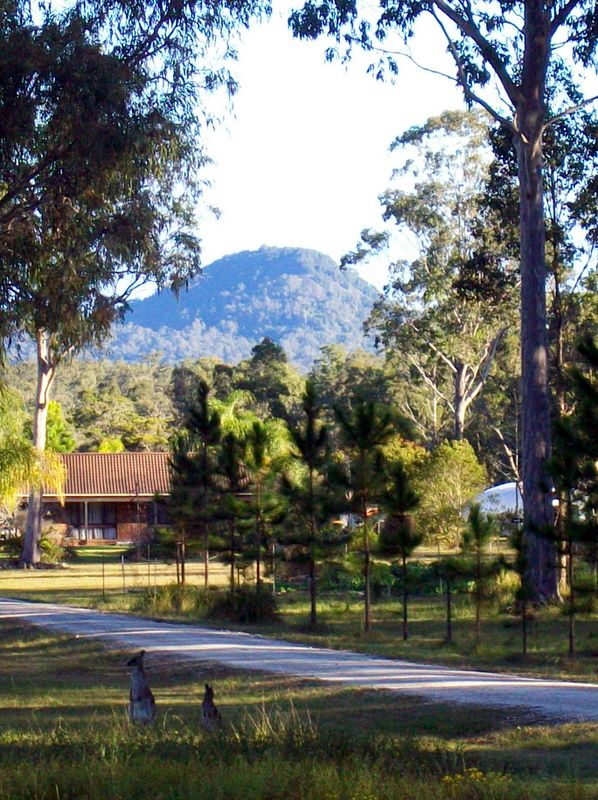
- Glenugie Peak, the type location of Cryptocarya floydii

Conservation status
- Data Deficient (IUCN 3.1)

Scientific classification
- Kingdom: Plantae
- Clade: Tracheophytes
- Clade: Angiosperms
- Clade: Magnoliids
- Order: Laurales
- Family: Lauraceae
- Genus: Cryptocarya
- Species: C. floydii

Binomial name
- Cryptocarya floydii Kosterm.

= Cryptocarya floydii =

Glenugie laurel

Species of tree

Cryptocarya floydii, commonly known as Glenugie laurel or gorge laurel is a species of flowering plant in the family Lauraceae and is endemic to eastern Australia. It is a tree with lance-shaped leaves, pale green tube-shaped flowers, and spherical black drupes.

== Description ==
Cryptocarya floydii is a tree that typically grows to a height of up to 15 m (49 ft) and a trunk dbh of 25 cm (9.8 in). The trunk is irregular, sometimes fluted, buttressed and multi-stemmed. The leaves are lance-shaped, mostly 30–110 mm (1.2–4.3 in) long, 10–35 mm (0.39–1.38 in) wide and leathery, the upper surface dark green and shiny, the lower surface dull green. The flowers are dull green and borne in panicles that are shorter than the leaves, the perianth tube 1.6 mm (0.063 in) long and 1.7 mm (0.067 in) wide. The tepals are 2.2 mm (0.087 in) long and 1.1 mm (0.043 in) wide, the outer anthers 0.7 mm (0.028 in) long and 0.5 mm (0.020 in) wide, the inner anthers 0.7 mm (0.028 in) long and 0.4 mm (0.016 in) wide. Flowering occurs between October and February and the fruit is a spherical black drupe, 10–15 mm (0.39–0.59 in) long and 12–18 mm (0.47–0.71 in) wide.

== Taxonomy ==
Cryptocarya floydii was first formally described in 1979 by André Joseph Guillaume Henri Kostermans in the journal Brunonia, from specimens collected on Glenugie Peak near Grafton in 1959.

== Distribution and habitat ==
This species of Cryptocarya grows in drier rainforest, usually in rocky areas, from 300 to 1,050 m (980 to 3,440 ft) elevation between the Bunya Mountains in southern Queensland and Wollomombi Falls in northern New South Wales.

== Ecology ==
A thin layer of flesh over the relatively large seed would offer little nourishment for feeding birds. Alexander Floyd considers this fruit to be mimetic, as the fruit resembles more fleshy fruits such as the vine Tetrastigma nitens.
