= Thomson orogeny =

Mountain building process in Gondwana

The Thomson Orogeny was a mountain building event (orogeny) from 510 to 495 million years in Gondwana, now situated mainly in the Australian state of Queensland.

== Structural geology and sequence of events ==
The rocks deformed during the Thomson Orogeny, referred to as the Thomson Orogen, underlie most of western and central Queensland in Australia. The rocks are mostly rich in quartz and metasedimentary, overlain by younger Mesozoic rocks and the Devonian backarc basin sediments of the Adavale Basin. Detrital zircon dating of Thomson Orogen rocks indicates ages between 510 and 495 million years ago, spanning the Cambrian to the Devonian.

In the northern part of the Thomson Orogen, rifting in the late Neoproterozoic is recorded in the lower metamorphic rocks of the Anakie Province.

In the south, the Thomson Orogen borders the Lachlan Orogen, separated by the Olepoloko Fault in the west and the Louth-Eumarra Shear Zone in the east. Unlike the Thomson Orogen, the Lachlan Orogen has significant Silurian sedimentary rocks. The Thomson Orogen extends east under the Bowen Basin and based on seismic reflection data, seems to the underlie the western edge of the New England Orogen. In the north, it borders the North Queensland Orogen and much older Paleoproterozoic craton rocks.

The Thompson, Lachlan and New England orogens together with the Delamerian Orogen constitute the Tasman Orogenic System.
