= Mélange =

Large-scale breccia

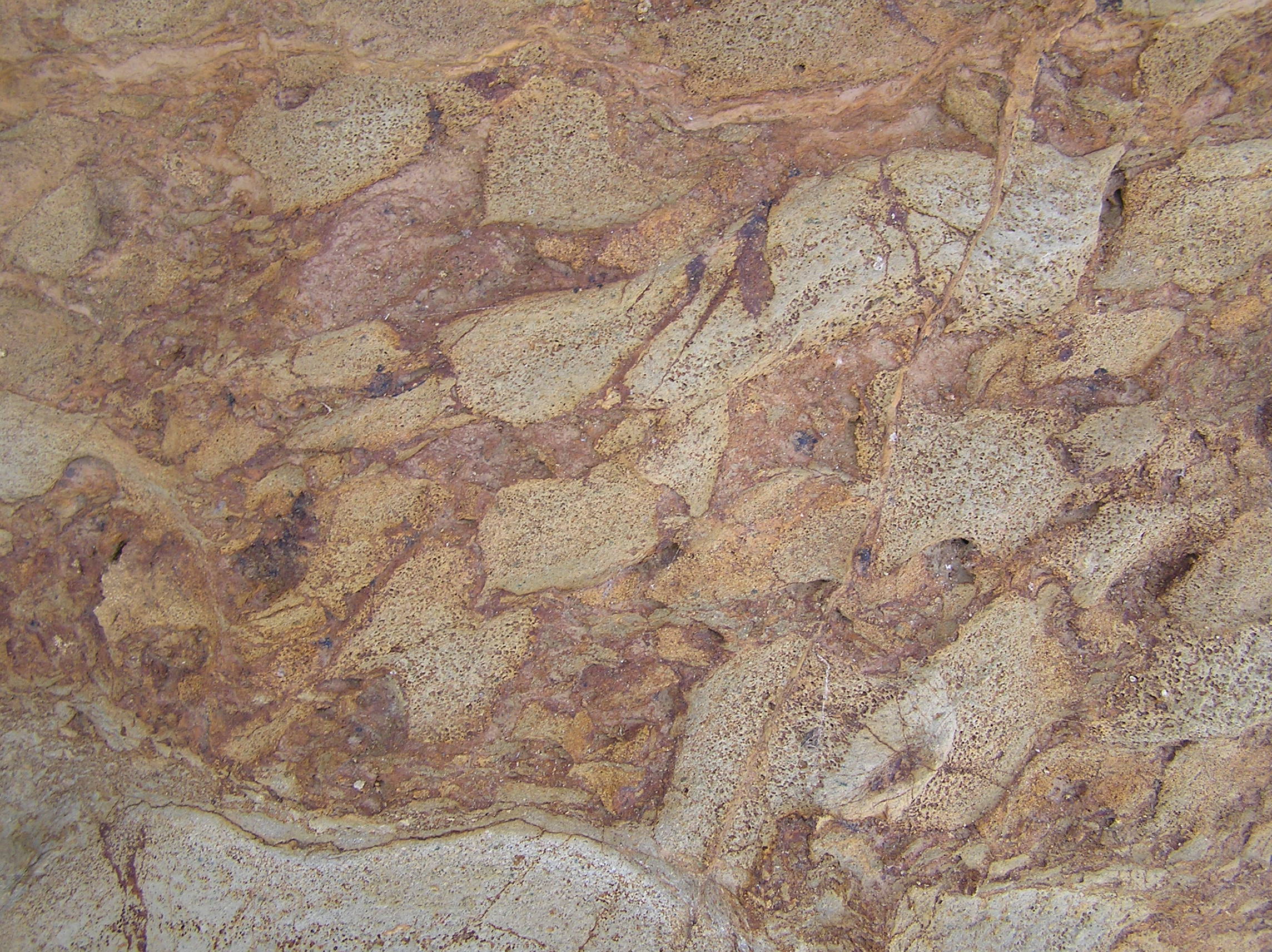
Melange from Narooma, Australia.

In geology, a mélange is a large-scale breccia, a mappable body of rock characterized by a lack of continuous bedding and the inclusion of fragments of rock of all sizes, contained in a fine-grained deformed matrix. The mélange typically consists of a jumble of large blocks of varied lithologies. Both tectonic and sedimentary processes can form mélange.

Mélange occurrences are associated with thrust faulted terranes in orogenic belts. A mélange is formed in the accretionary wedge above a subduction zone. The ultramafic ophiolite sequences which have been obducted onto continental crust are typically underlain by a mélange. Smaller-scale localized mélanges may also occur in shear or fault zones, where coherent rock has been disrupted and mixed by shearing forces.

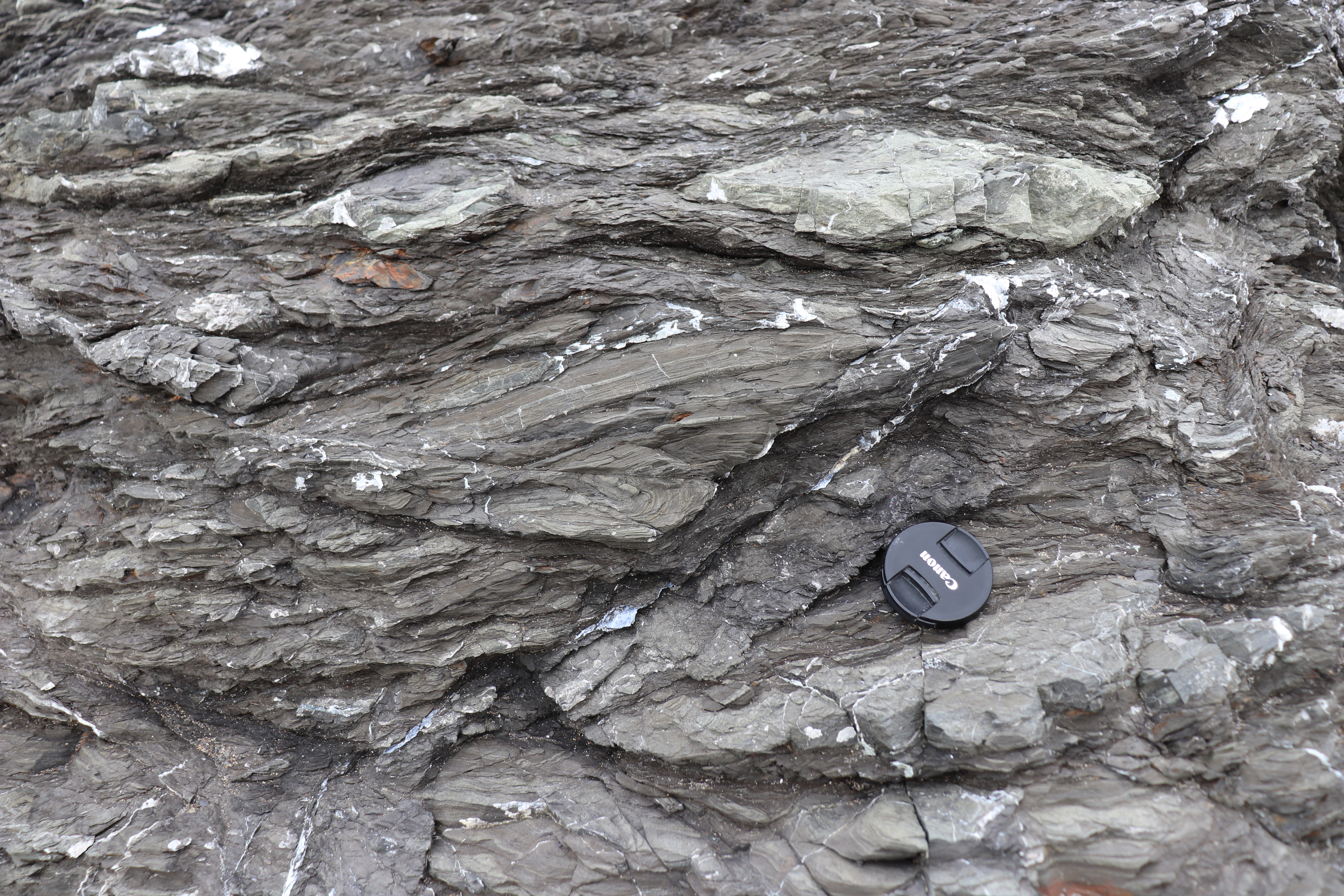
Shale matrix mélange with clasts of sandstone and greenstone on Marshall's Beach, San Francisco, US

Large-scale melanges formed in active continental margin settings generally consist of altered oceanic crustal material and blocks of continental slope sediments in a sheared mudstone matrix. The mixing mechanisms in such settings may include tectonic shearing forces, ductile flow of a water-charged or deformable matrix (such as serpentinite), sedimentary action (such as slumping, gravity-flow, and olistostromal action), or some combination of these. Some larger blocks of rock may be as much as 1 kilometre (0.62 mi) across.

Before the advent of plate tectonics in the early 1970s, it was difficult to explain mélanges in terms of known geological mechanisms. A particularly troubling paradox was the occurrence of blueschist blocks (low temperature and high pressure metamorphic rocks) in direct contact with graywacke (a coarse sandstone with lithic fragments) that was deposited in a sedimentary environment.

== Examples ==
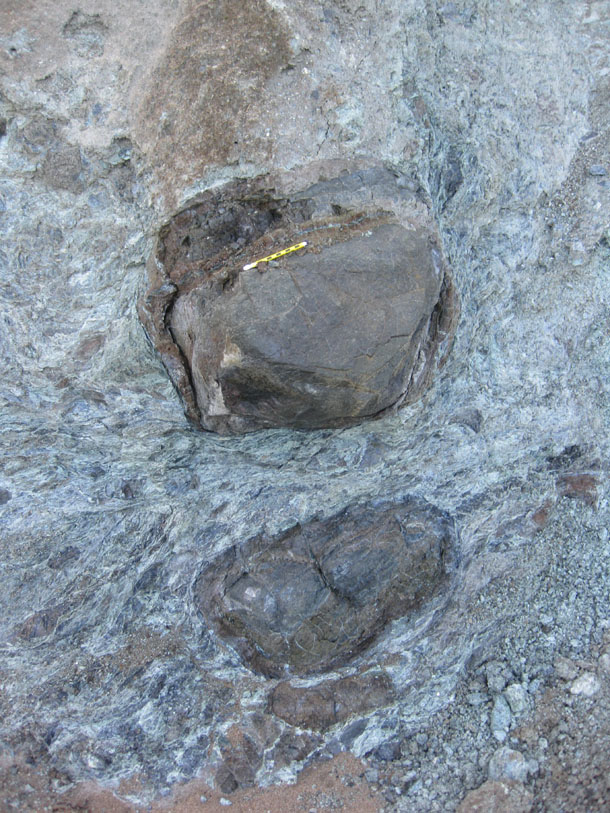
Serpentinite mélange showing block-in-matrix texture, exposed at Marshall's Beach in San Francisco. Pencil for scale.

Examples include the Franciscan Complex along the Coast Ranges of central and northern California and the Bay of Islands ophiolite complex in Newfoundland. The Gwna Mélange in the UK extends through Anglesey and the Llŷn Peninsula onto Bardsey Island in North Wales. The Northern Palawan melange is distributed in the Philippines' Miniloc Island, west coast of Inabamalaki Island, west coast of El Nido; Cudugman Point on Bacuit Bay, and in the Cuyo Group of Islands. It consists of a jumble of various rock types contained in a matrix of grey-green slaty mudstone and siltstone.

The Eastern Desert of Egypt is part of the Neoproterozoic Arabian-Nubian Shield and displays different occurrences of Neoproterozoic ophiolitic mélanges. The mélanges contain exotic and native blocks and fragments of variable sizes and types set in a sheared and schistose volcaniclastic matrix. The main exotic blocks are ophiolitic and include metamorphosed ultramafic rocks, metagabbros, massive and pillowed metabasalts and pelagic sedimentary rocks. Based on the mode of occurrences of the ophiolitic components and the processes of mélange formation, the ophiolitic mélanges of the Central Eastern Desert are classified and mapped into tectonic mélange, olistostrome and olistostromal mélange. Both tectonic and sedimentary processes played a major role during mélange formation in a back-arc or inter-arc setting.

There are mélanges in older continental margins as well. For example, east of the Appalachian Mountains there are many mélanges which were formed by exotic terranes during the formation of Pangea. They represent the closing of multiple subduction zones. Formations like the Mine Run complex and the Piney Branch complex in Virginia. These are interpreted as back-arc basins which were subsequently deformed during the Allegheny Orogeny. These rocks consist of ultramafic, metaplutonic, metabasalt, serpentinite, greenschist, and talc schist.

== Etymology ==
The term mélange in English is a loan word from French, used to mean a mixture of disparate components. Its derivation, and therefore to some extent its connotation, is similar to mêlée. Mélange is the modern form of the Old French noun meslance, which comes from the infinitive mesler, meaning "to mix".
