= Neranleigh-Fernvale Beds =

Geological formation in the eastern Australia

- Stratigraphic range: Late Devonian-Early Carboniferous; ~365–332 Ma
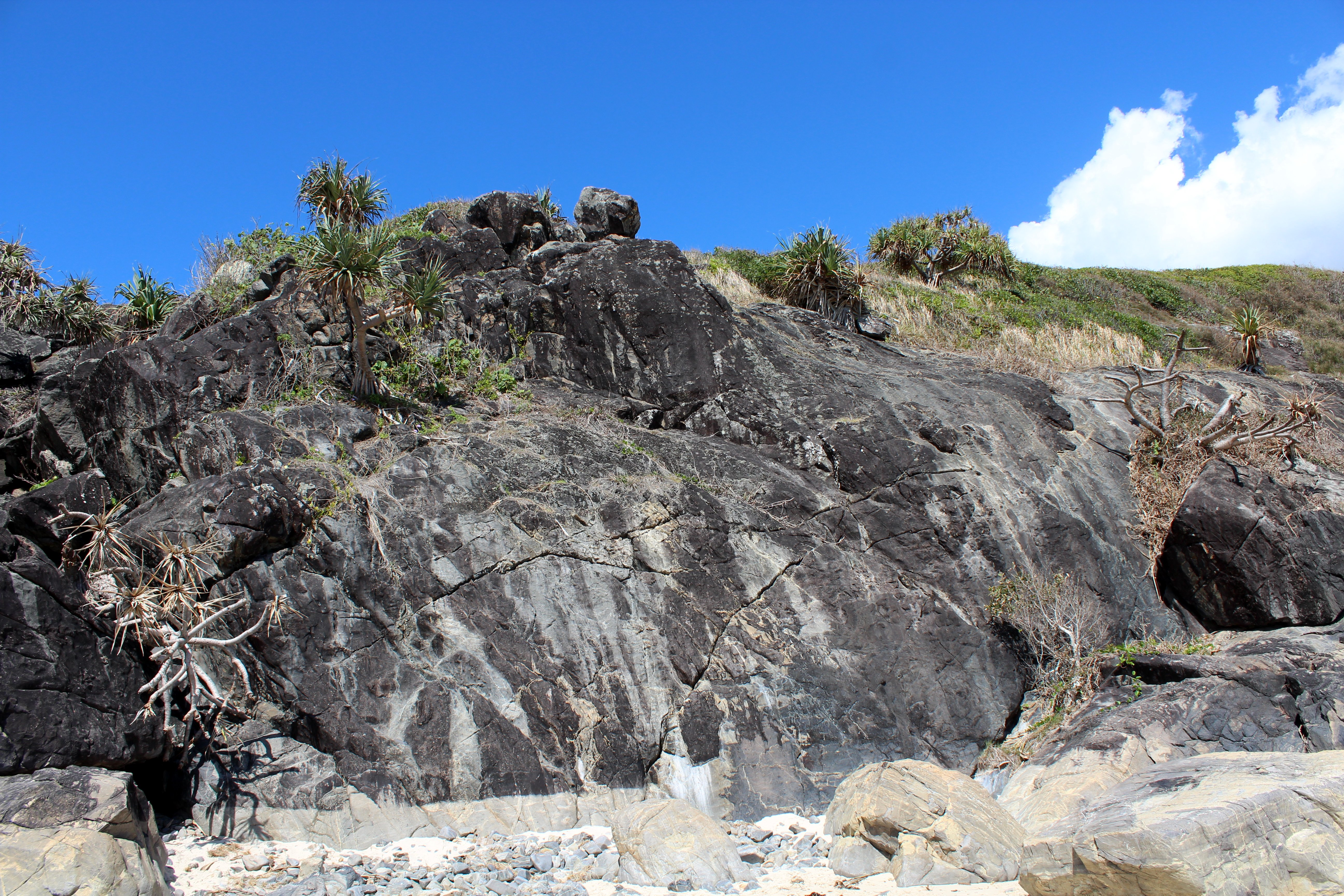
- Cabarita Beach, Australia
- Type: Geological formation
- Thickness: 2,500–3,500 m (8,200–11,500 ft)

Lithology
- Primary: Sandstone
- Other: Siltstone, chert, basalt

Location
- Coordinates: 28.334132°S 153.573864°E
- Region: New South Wales & Queensland
- Country: Australia

Type section
- Named for: Neranwood & Beenleigh
- Named by: Bryan and Jones 1950, renamed by Korsch, R.J. & Harrington, H.J., 1981
- Year defined: 1950
- Region: New South Wales & Queensland
- Country: Australia
- Neranleigh-Fernvale Beds (Australia) Neranleigh-Fernvale Beds (Queensland)

The Neranleigh-Fernvale beds is a geologic formation in the north east of New South Wales and Queensland, Australia. This formation was created in the Late Devonian to the Early Carboniferous, of a thickness up to 3,500 metres (11,500 ft).

== Description ==
This formation contains a heterogeneous succession of sandstone. Either derived from volcanic action, or locally oolitic. Other constituents include siltstone, chert and minor mafic volcanics including pillow basalt. Conglomerate and jasper, with low metamorphosed greenschist are also present. Basaltic volcanics are interbedded with the Neranleigh-Fernvale sediments. Fossils are rarely encountered.

== See also ==
- Clarence-Moreton Basin
