= Bundook beds =

Rock formation in eastern Australia

Bundook Beds
- Stratigraphic range: Devonian
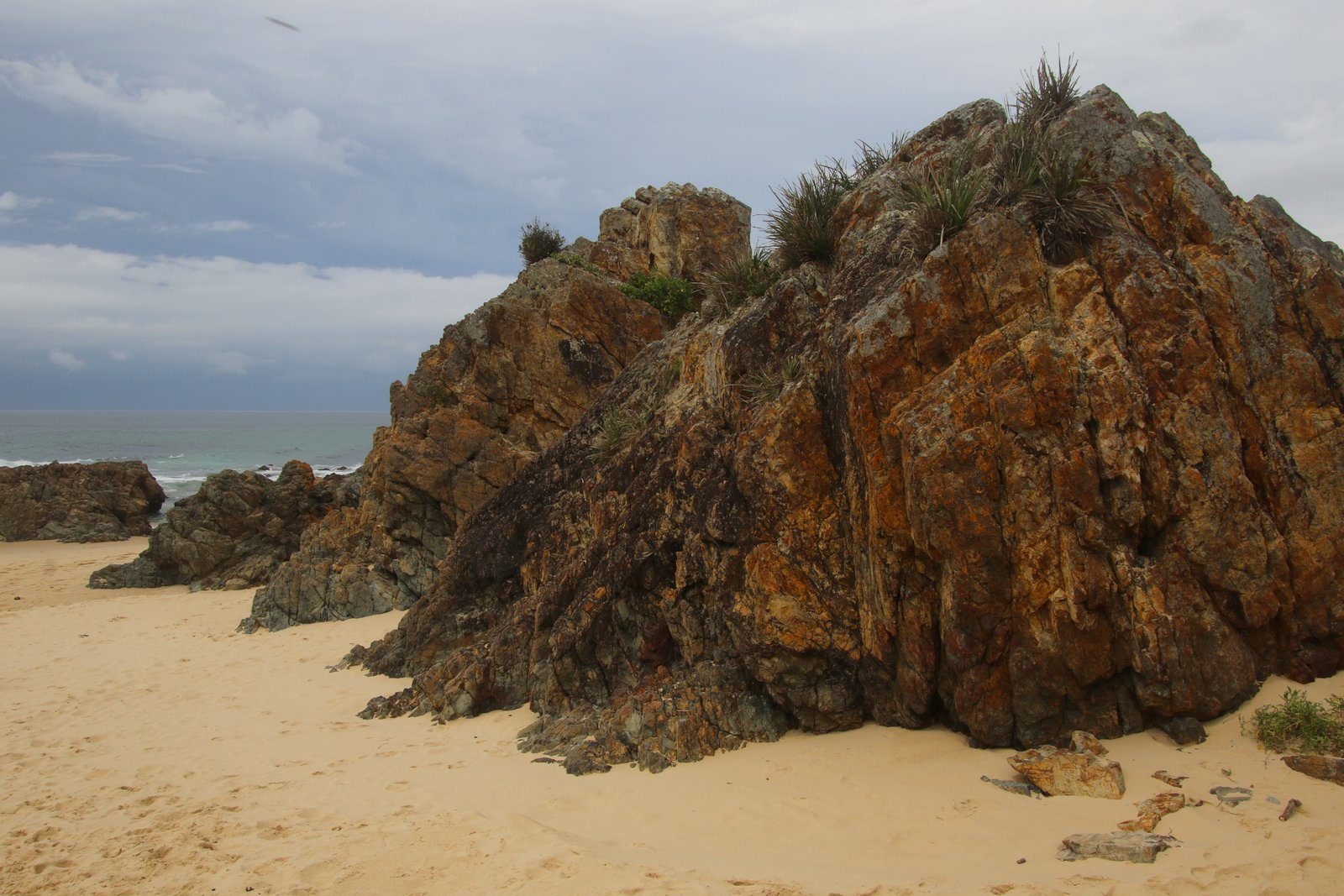
- Black Head, New South Wales, Australia
- Type: Geological formation
- Underlies: Wallanbah Formation
- Thickness: up to 2,740 metres (8,990 ft)

Location
- Location: New England Orogen
- Country: Australia

Type section
- Location: New South Wales
- Year defined: 1988
- Country: Australia

The Bundook Beds is a rock formation in the New England Orogen in eastern Australia. The maximum thickness is 2,740 metres, Formed between the Famennian and Frasnian in the late Devonian geological period.

Bundook beds consists of grey to brown lithic sandstone and siltstone, frequently cherty and ribbon banded. The formation is interbedded with massive greywackes, minor conglomerates and minor limestone.

== See also ==
- Hunter-Bowen orogeny
