= Tasman Orogen =

Orogenic zome in Eastetrn Australia

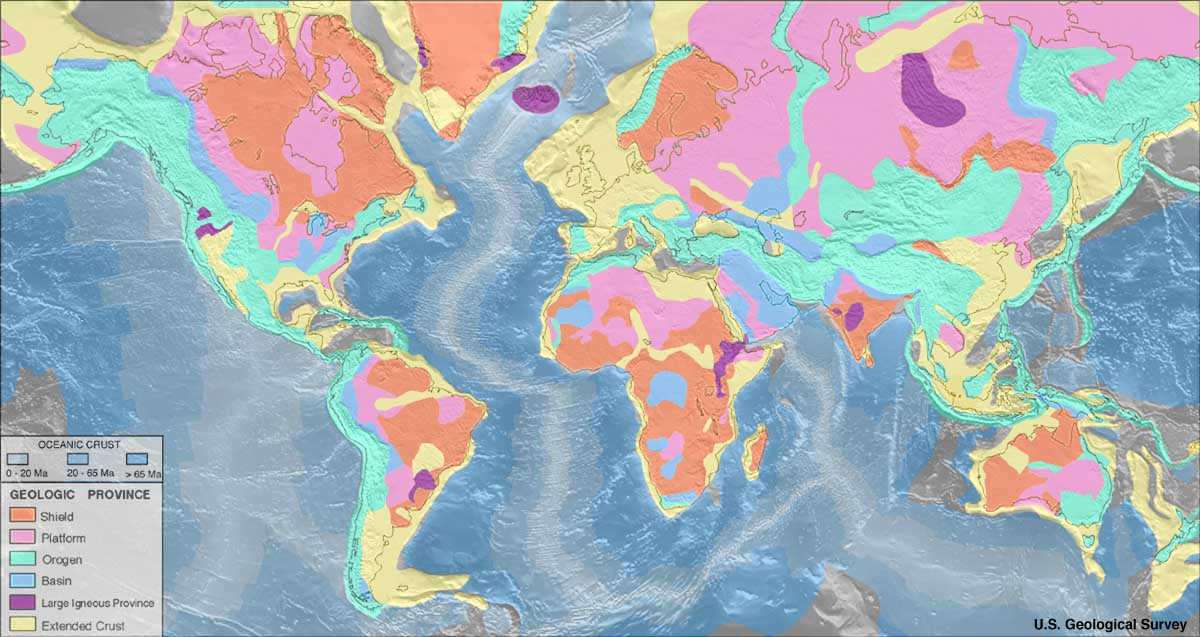
Geologic provinces of the world (USGS): Shield Platform Orogen Basin Large igneous province Extended crust / Oceanic crust: 0–20 Ma 20–65 Ma >65 Ma

The Tasman Orogen, Tasman Orogenic Zone or Tasman Orogenic System is an orogenic zone that covers the seaboard of Eastern Australia and part of the adjacent Tasman Sea stretching from southern Tasmania to northern Queensland. It is a general term that includes a number of orogenic belts formed during Paleozoic. These include Delamerian Orogen, Lachlan Orogen, New England Orogen, Thomson Orogen.

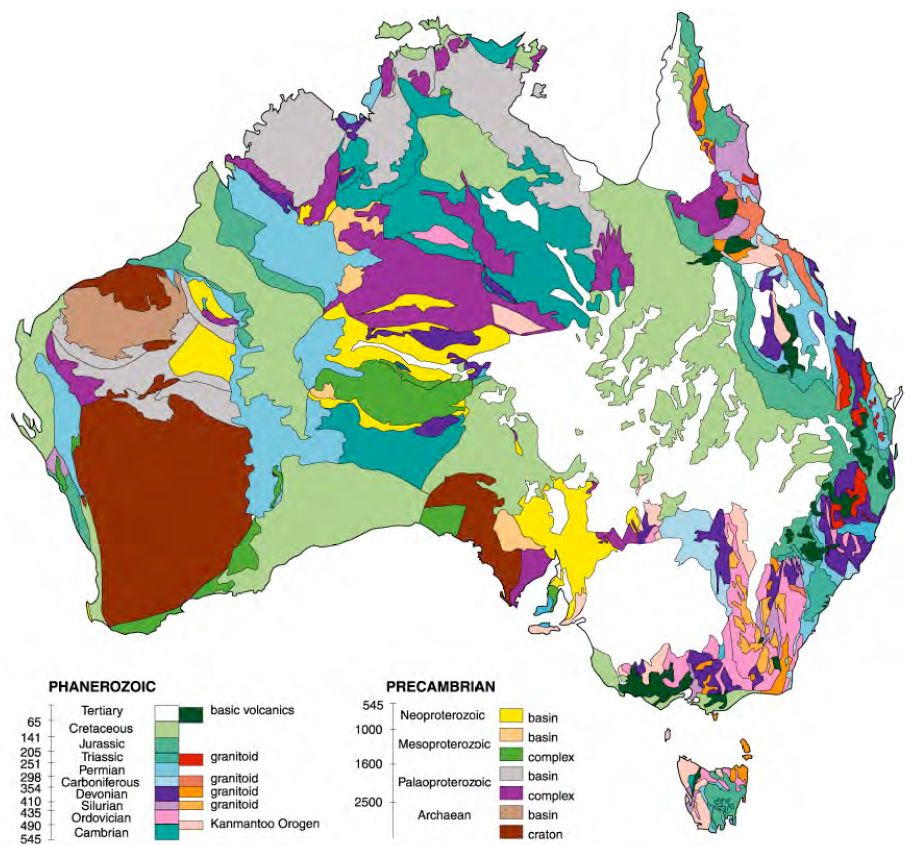
Basic geological units of Australia
