= Narooma terrane =

Geological structural region on the south coast of New South Wales, Australia

The Narooma terrane or Narooma Accretionary Complex is a geological structural region on the south coast of New South Wales, Australia that is the remains of a subduction zone or an oceanic terrane. It can be found on the surface around Narooma, Batemans Bay and down south into Victoria near Mallacoota. It has attached itself to the Lachlan Fold Belt and has been considered as either an exotic terrane or as a part of the fold belt. Rocks are turbidites, block in matrix mélange, chert, and volcanics. The accretionary complex itself could either be the toe of a subduction zone, or an accretionary prism. It was moved by the Pacific Plate westwards for about 2500 km until it encountered the east coast of Gondwana. It is part of the Mallacoota Zone according to Willman, which in turn is part of the Eastern Lachlan Fold Belt, which is part of the Benambra Terrane.

== Components ==
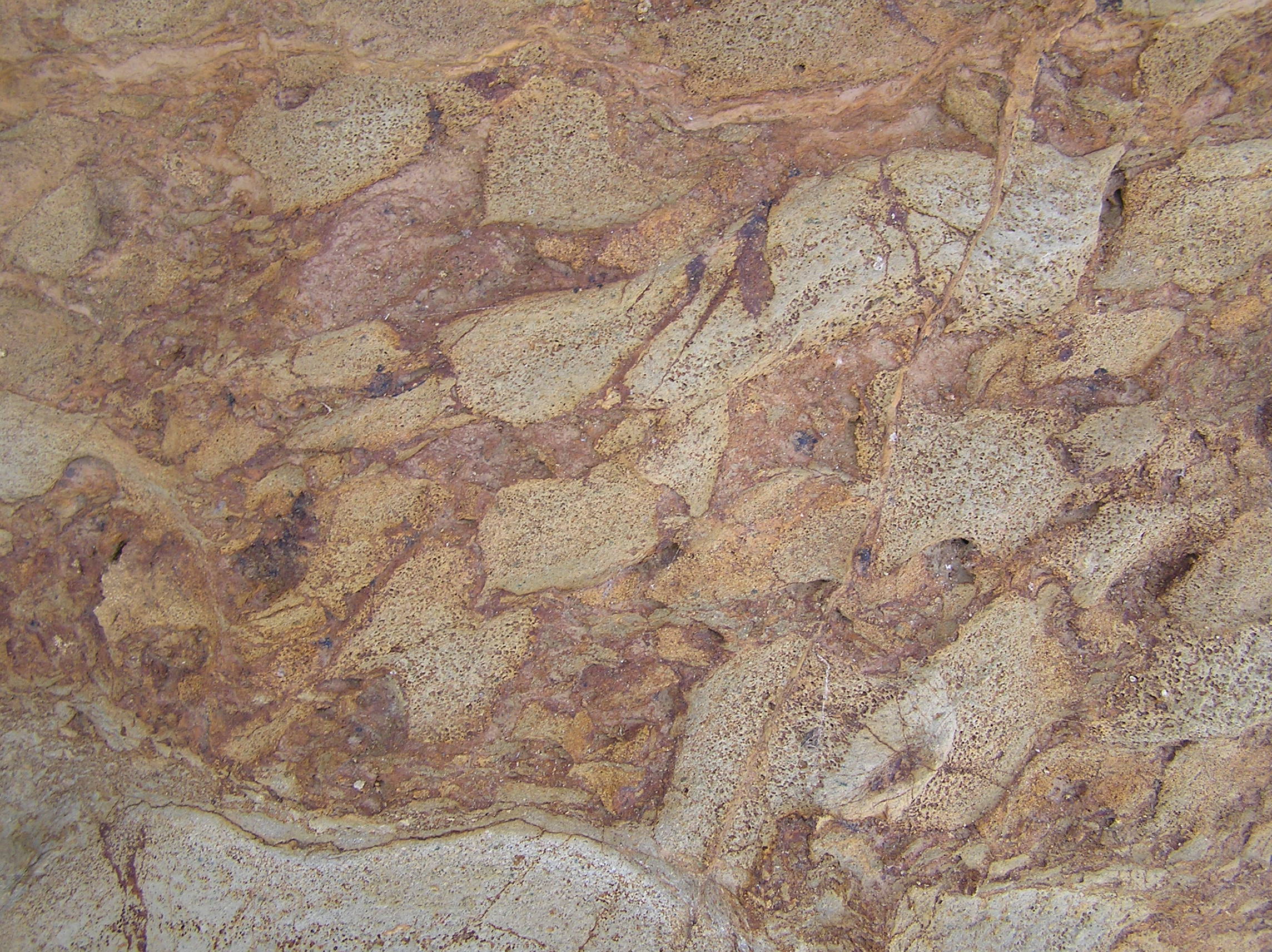
Mélange from Narooma

The complex is made up of an imbricate stack in a sequence that is the same both at Narooma and Murruna Point, Batemans Bay. The top layer consists of turbidite sequence from the Early Ordovician. Below this is a high strain zone full of broken fragments. Special textures from the high strain zone include pressure solution, dilational veins and boudinage. Some of the rock appears as mylonite. Underneath the high strain is chert from the Late Cambrian to Late Ordovician.

The lowest part of the stack is block in mélange. The blocks are mostly turbidite, but also includes chert, and some pillow lava basalt. The blocks are at all different orientations, different sizes all mixed together. The sediments were deformed into these blocks before they turned into stone. Later deformation has developed a cleavage with lenses of chlorite, quartz and white mica. The strike direction of the cleavage is 330°. The interpretation of the mélange is that it is either an olistostrome or an upwelling. The mélange was underplated beneath the chert layer. Pockets of underplated material are expected to form low angle detachments.

The inland zone has a chevron folded structure with reverse faults.

=== Stratigraphy ===
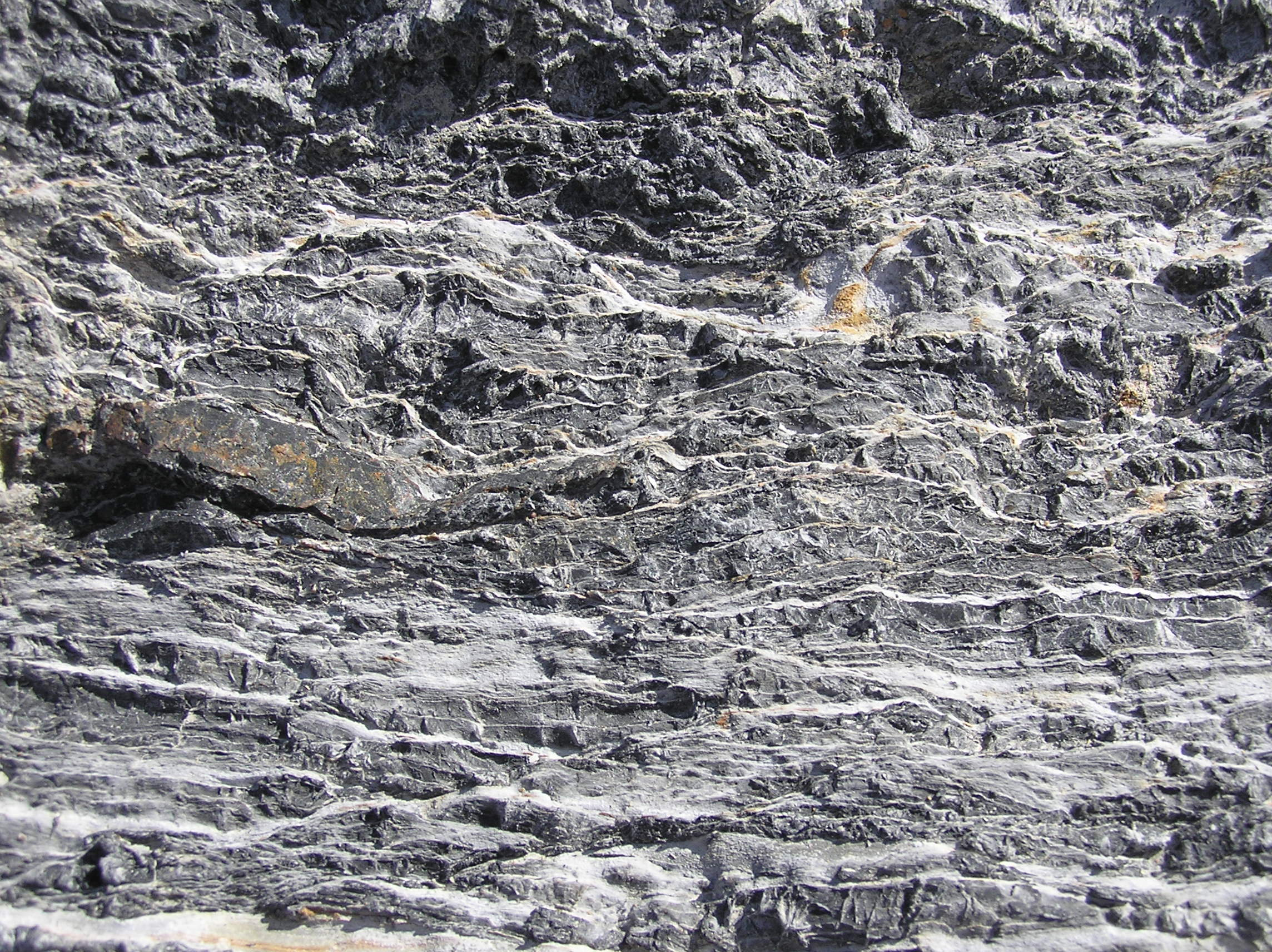
Narooma Chert from Australia Rock, Narooma

From the stratigraphic point of view the terrane comprises the Wagonga Group. This consists of the Narooma Chert overlain by the Bogolo Formation.

== History ==
=== Formation ===
Deep sea chert (Narooma Chert) was deposited on the Pacific Ocean floor over a period of 50 million years from Late Cambrian to Ordovician. Fossils from the chert include the conodonts Paracordylodus gracilis and Acodus cf. A. comptus. The terrane gradually approached the continental margin and began to include sediments derived from the continent, such as sandstone, siltstone, argillite and shale as well as chert bands.

=== Deformation ===
After formation the terrane was accreted to the Lachlan Fold Belt in the early Silurian. The rock was deformed in the Benambran Orogeny in early Silurian. A low angle oblique imbrication formed. Rocks have become more deformed closer to the coast as the trench is approached. The country here was shortened between middle Silurian to Middle Devonian in the east–west direction, with many folds and thrust faults. Inland the rocks have developed a scaly cleavage. The chert on the coast has developed a dextral shear.
