= Murray Basin =

Cenozoic sedimentary basin in south eastern Australia

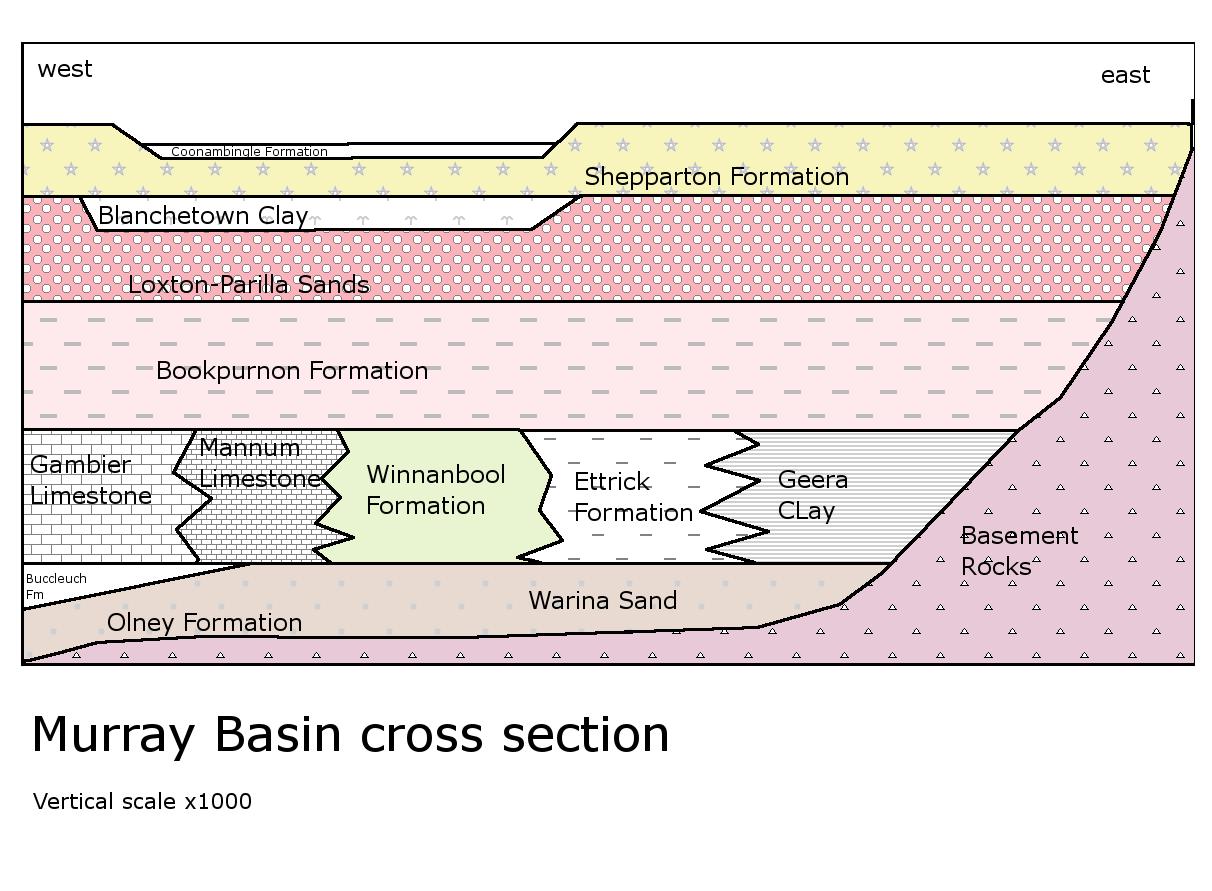
Sediment layers of Murray Basin

The Murray Basin is a Cenozoic sedimentary basin in south eastern Australia. The basin is only shallow, but extends into New South Wales, Victoria and South Australia. It takes its name from the Murray River which traverses the Basin from east to west.

== Formation ==
One theory for the formation of the basin is that it is dynamic topography due to a sinking slab of oceanic crust. This slab was subducted during latest Cretaceous and Early Cenozoic periods to the north of the Australian continent underneath New Guinea. The slab broke off and was gradually overridden by the Australian Plate moving north. The sinking slab has a trace in the P-wave velocity in the mantle which is higher from 800 to 1200 km deep below the Murray basin, and also the Lake Eyre Basin. The velocity anomaly is oriented northwest-southeast and extends from 135°E 26°S to 144°E35°S. The sinking has dragged down the rock above it to make a hollow which is the basin. This hollow has moved south over the last 50 million years. If this theory is correct, then the Murray basin will move south over the next tens of millions of years and disappear under the Southern Ocean. Modelling using the Underworld program by Moresi indicates that the slab would be sinking at 8.5 mm per year and cause a depression on the surface 200 m deep around 2500 km wide. In the past the basin depression was narrower but deeper in this model.

== Geologic history ==
After Australia separated from Antarctica, the Murray Basin was formed. The basin floor only subsided slowly over time. The basin became filled with up to 600 metres (1,970 ft) of sediments during the Cenozoic Era.

From Paleocene to the Eocene Epoch, the western side was flooded with seawater and deposited the Warina sand. The sea withdrew, and later in the Eocene, silt and clay of the Olney Formation were deposited. One minor sea incursion in the Late Eocene resulted in the Buccleuch Formation in South Australia. The group of deposits is termed the Renmark Group and was earlier known as the Knight Group.

The sea level rose again in Late Oligocene to mid Miocene, forming the Murray Group of sediments, with marl and limestone in the deeper locations, and the Geera Clay in the shallow waters. The rock units formed in the deeper water included the Ettric Formation (see cross-section image), the Winnanbool Formation and the Mannum Formation limestone with Gambier Limestone in South Australia. When the sea level fell again in mid-Miocene, the deposited Geera clay and Olney Formation moved westward over the limestone.

During Upper Miocene to Pliocene, the sea rose and fell several times. The first sea rise formed the Murravian Gulf and resulted in clay and marl in the west, called the Bookpurnong Formation, with the Calivil Formation river and lake sand in the east. When the sea retreated in Early Pliocene, the Loxton Sands, also informally known as Loxton-Parilla Sands, were formed on the beach on the shore of the emergent land. Locally heavy minerals have been concentrated by wave action, including rutile zircon and ilmenite, forming economic mining opportunities.

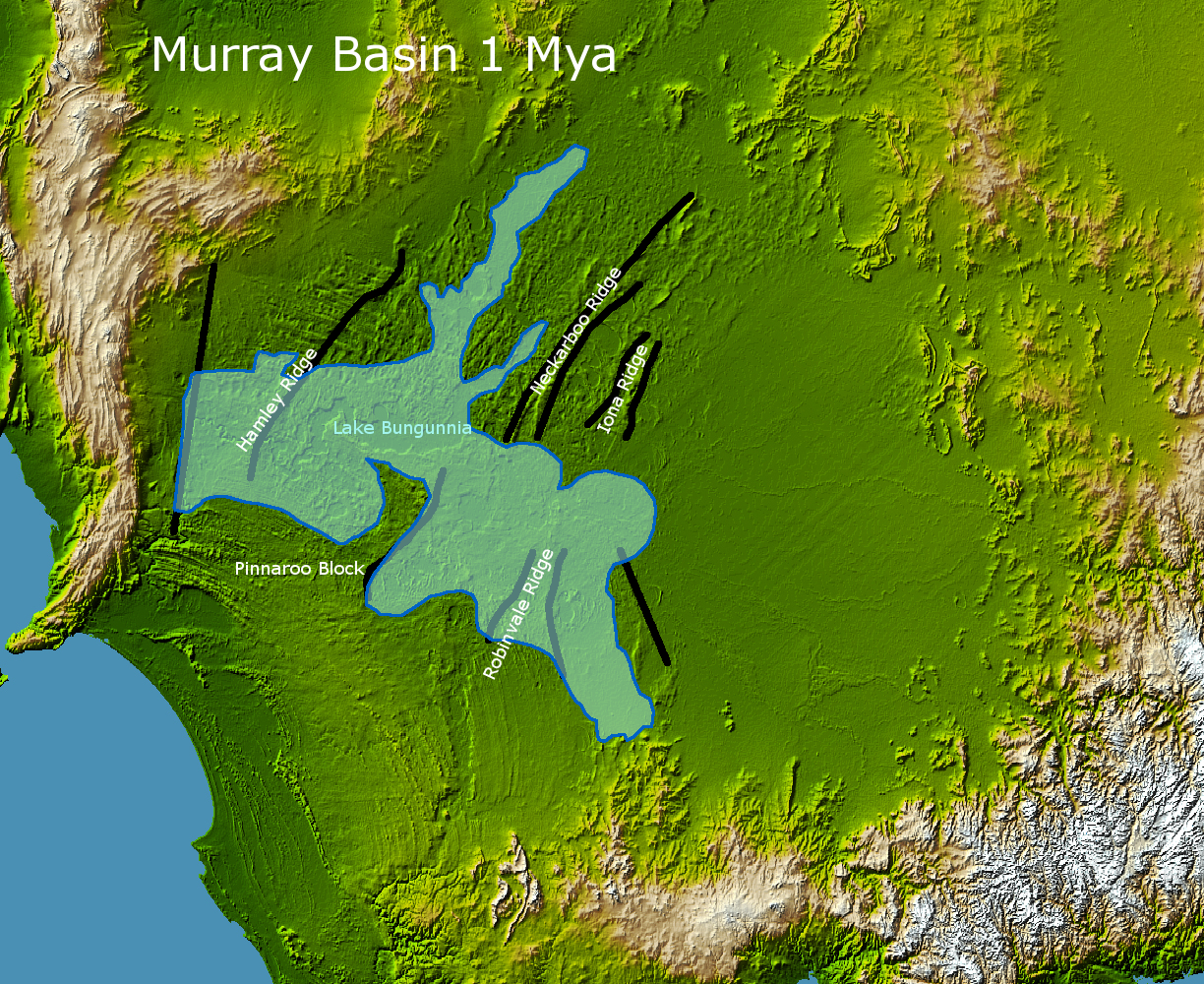
Lake Bungunnia around 1 Mya

The Murray River became dammed by uplift of over 250 metres (820 ft) in the Grampians in Victoria during the Pleistocene about 2.5 Mya. The dam formed Lake Bungunnia, which reached 40,000 square kilometres (15,000 sq mi) and deposited the Blanchetown Clay therein. Higher rainfall of at least 500 millimetres (20 inches) per year kept the lake filled at first, but during later times, rainfall was insufficient, and saline lakes formed, depositing dolomite. Even today, some saline lakes remain as a remnant of the vast lake. The Murray River carved out a new path to the sea via Murray Bridge, replacing its previous exit at Portland, Victoria. The lake was gone by about 0.7 Mya.

The Pooraka Formation formed in the north west due to increased erosion, resulting in colluvium depositing. The colluvium forms fans, cones and scree slopes, and often contains clay and breccia. In the flat areas, the Shepparton Formation also resulted from river deposits of floodplain clay.

Most of the existing surface dates from Quaternary period. The river deposits from the east have been progressively overlaying the marine deposits further west, as the shore line receded. Within the Pleistocene deposits are three layers of sand that are aquifers, deposited during higher rainfall periods of the interglacials. The floodplain deposits from the current rivers are the Coonambidgal Formation, however this term is used informally for the older Pleistocene flood deposits as well. During the dryer glacial periods the area was arid.

== See also ==
- Deniliquin multiple-ring feature, detected under the Murray Basin
- Darling Sedimentary Basin
