= Clarence Moreton Basin =

Sedimentary basin in Australia

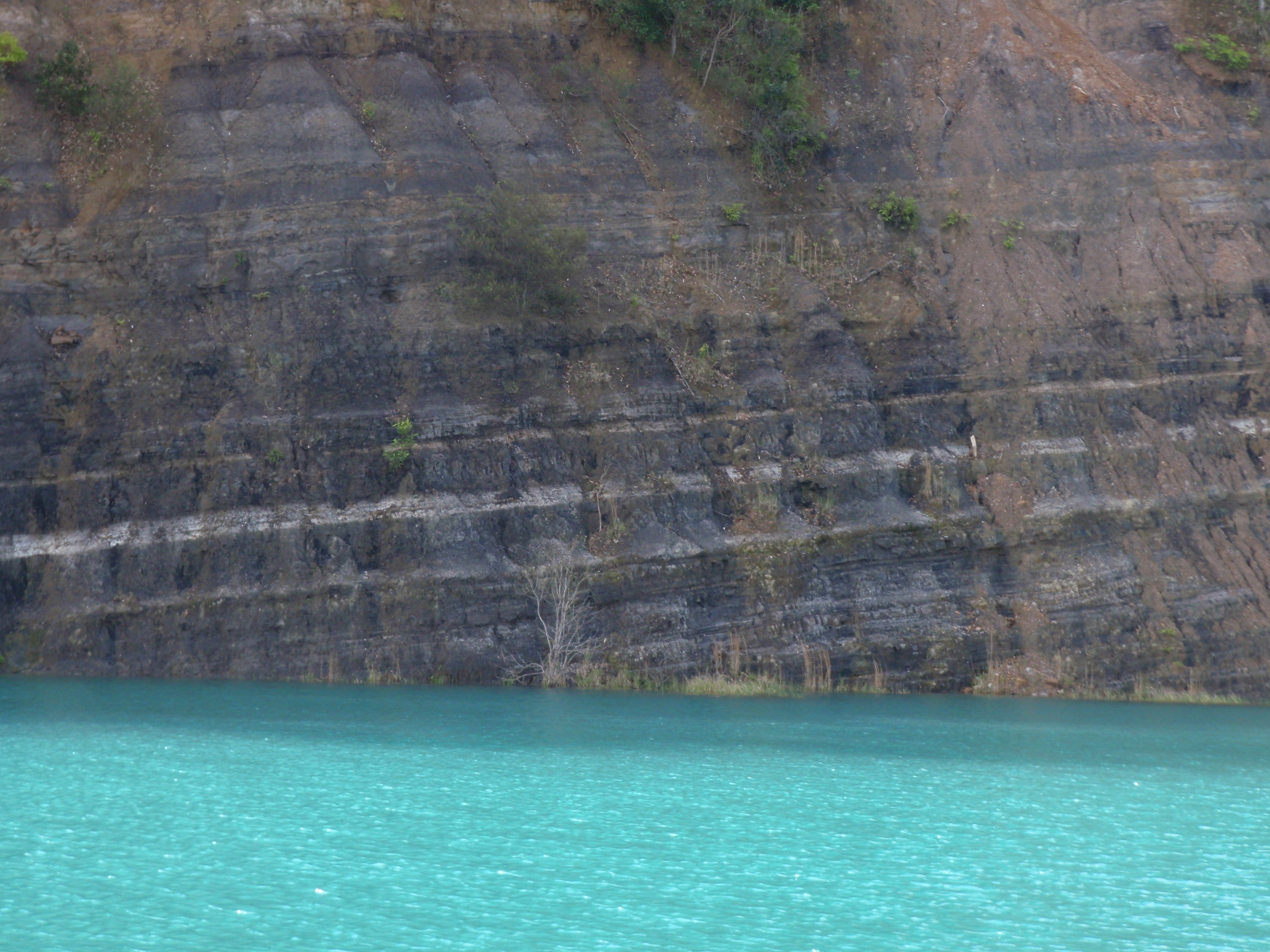
- Walloon Coal Measures exposed in quarry at Bexhill

- Location in Australia
- Coordinates: 30°00′S 152°30′E
- Location: Northern Rivers, New South Wales & South East Queensland

Characteristics
- Area: 16,000 km^{2} (6,200 sq mi)
- Range: Tweed, Border, Lamington, McPherson

Geology
- Basin type: Rift basin
- Age: Late Triassic-Early Cretaceous
- Stratigraphy: Stratigraphy

The Clarence Moreton Basin is a Mesozoic sedimentary basin on the easternmost part of the Australian continent. It is located in the far north east of the state of New South Wales around Lismore and Grafton and in the south east corner of Queensland. It is the part of the Great Artesian Basin that extends to the east coast in Australia's central eastern lowlands.

== Description ==
It formed by oblique extension of the underlying Paleozoic New England Orogen basement. It consists of continental deposits, starting with a small amount of Triassic coal beds, and then mostly Jurassic and Cretaceous sedimentary rocks. The basin covers 16,000 square kilometres (6,200 sq mi). The basin was named when the Clarence Basin (named after the Clarence River) and Moreton Basin in Queensland were proved to be one structure.

Oil is likely to be present in the basin.

== Stratigraphy ==
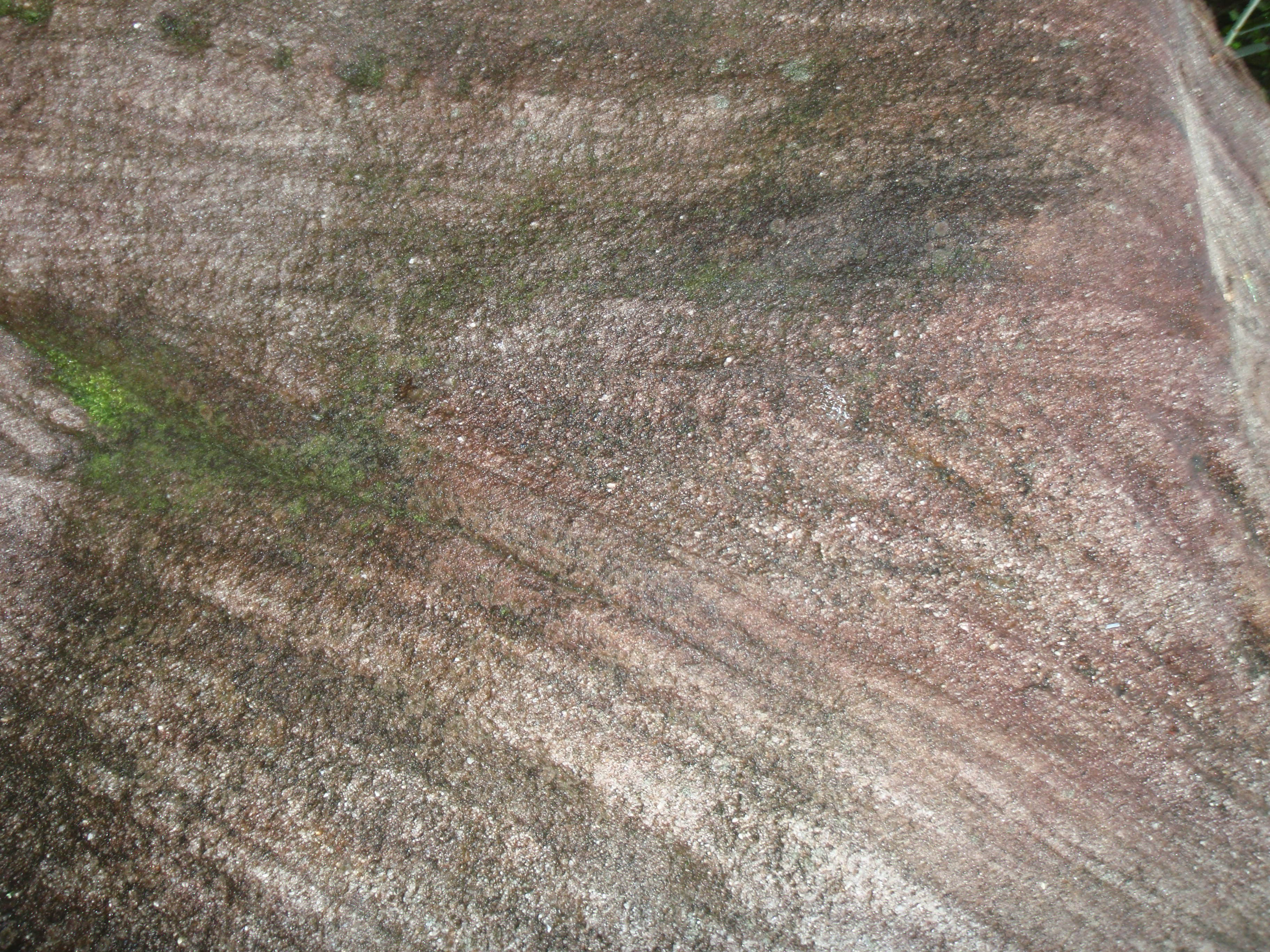
Kangaroo Creek Sandstone

The oldest rocks in the Clarence Moreton Basin of New South Wales are the Chillingham Volcanics. These are from some time in the Triassic period, and crop out in a band north and south of Chillingham. They consist of conglomerate at the base, rhyolite, lithic rhyolitic tuff, and shale. The Nymboida Coal Measures extend from Nymboida to Kangaroo Creek. They consist of lithic sandstones (wackes, minor arenites), siltstone, polymictic conglomerate, coal, rhyolitic tuff, and basalt. The total thickness is over 1,000 metres (3,300 ft). The outcrop is 90 square kilometres (35 sq mi), and it forms a north west trending band 29 kilometres (18 mi) long on the southwest tip of the basin. Fossils reveal a date of middle Triassic. A lower part is called Cloughers Creek Formation. The Basin Creek Formation includes the coal mined at Nymboida. The Bardool Conglomerate forming a 180 metres (590 ft) thick layer, is also a unit in the coal measures. The conglomerate includes a 15-metre (49 ft) thick layer of basalt exposed at Copes Creek. The Neranleigh-Fernvale Beds are up to 3,500 metres thick.

The Red Cliff Coal Measures date to the Late Triassic. It forms an outcropping belt 2.5 kilometres (1.6 mi) wide and 19 kilometres (12 mi) long from Buchanans Head through Red Cliff. The Evans Head Coal Measures are correlated with these, but are further up the north coast at Evans Head.

The basin was next uplifted and eroded and then deepened considerably and Bundamba group rocks form a complete V shape on both sides of the basin. In the northern parts the rock is mostly friable sandstone, but in the south it is divided into conglomerate below and siltstone above. The Laytons Range Conglomerate rests on the basin floor and extends from Baryulgil, to Nymboida. The conglomerate often appears as a cliff. The Corindi Conglomerate is a local name for a hailstone sized gravel near Corindi. The Mill Creek Siltstone. are often olive green or yellow-brown with bright red joint planes.

The Marburg Subgroup extends for 225 kilometres (140 mi) along the western side of the basin into Queensland from Corindi. It is mostly clay cemented cross bedded quartz sandstone, but this is interbedded with claystone and shale. At the base is the Blaxland Fossil Wood Conglomerate Member at Blaxlands Creek. The fossil wood is in the form of horizontal tree trunks up to 18 metres (59 ft) long and 600 millimetres (24 in) in diameter. The fossilization process replaced the wood with limonite and hematite. The Towallum Basalt is a 15-metre (49 ft) thick layer near Nymboida, Glenreagh and Moleton trig station overlying the Marburg formation. The Walloon Coal Measures forms a U shape around the east, south and west sides of the basin. It consists of claystone, shale, siltstone, arenites, and coal seams and the plant fossils in it show a Jurassic age.

The next layer of rocks in the basin forming a nested U shape in its exposure is the Kangaroo Creek Sandstone. This sandstone has saccharoidal texture, and glistens white and cream. This is not due to angular sand grains, but results from silica crystallization. It is up to 150 metres (490 ft) thick.

The Grafton Formation is the sedimentary unit in the core of the basin. It is the youngest of the beds being between Late Jurassic and Early Cretaceous. It occurs from Grafton to Casino consisting of soft sandstone, siltstone and claystone. Dolerite has intruded this at Glenugie Peak, and near Banyabba.

Rifting along the east coast of Australia commenced and uplifted the eastern side of the Clarence Moreton Basin. This resulted in the splitting off of the Lord Howe Rise and the opening of the ocean floor.
