= Darling Sedimentary Basin =

Sedimentary basin in western New South Wales

The Darling Sedimentary Basin, or simply the Darling Basin, is located in western New South Wales, bordered in the north by the line Broken Hill-Wilcannia -Cobar and stretching southward towards the Murray River. It is an old sedimentary basin dated by Late Cambrian/Silurian to Early Carboniferous. It is an intra-cratonic depositional center, mostly filled with Devonian sedimentary rocks up to 8 km in thickness. It is overlaid by the Eromanga Basin in the north and the Murray Basin in the south. It covers the area on over 100,000 km^{2}.

Darling and Murray basins are separated by the Lachlan Fold Belt.

Major troughs and sub-basins include Cobar Basin, Mt Hope Trough, Rast Trough and Melrose Trough.

The Moomba to Sydney Pipeline crosses the area.

== See also ==
- Darling River
