= Glenugie Peak =

Geologic formation in New South Wales

- Mount Elaine; Glen Ugie Peak
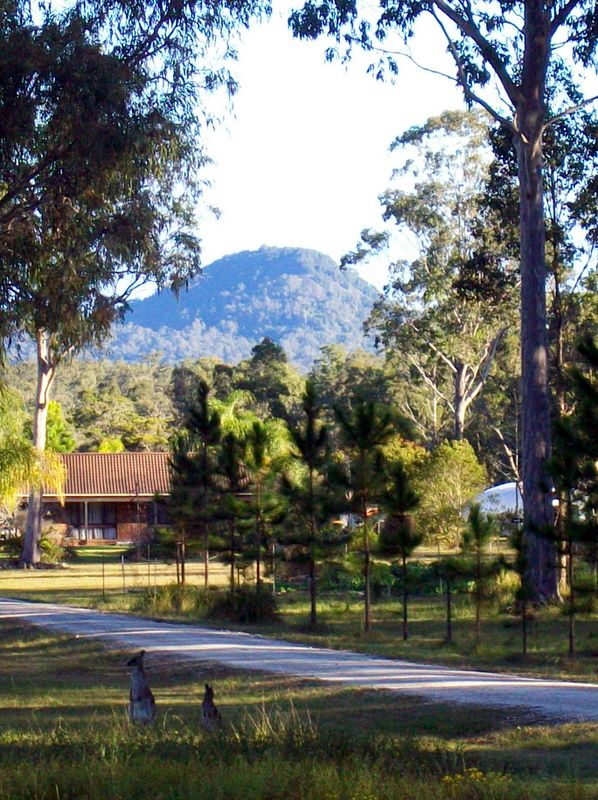
- Glenugie Peak with eastern grey kangaroos (at bottom left)

Highest point
- Elevation: 316 m (1,037 ft)
- Coordinates: 29°50′0″S 153°03′48″E

Geography
- Location within New South Wales
- Location: Northern Rivers region, New South Wales, Australia

Geology
- Rock age: Cenozoic
- Mountain type: Dolerite

Glenugie Peak, also known as Mount Elaine or Glen Ugie Peak, is a mountain that forms part of the ridge surrounding the Clarence Moreton Basin. It is situated in the Northern Rivers region of New South Wales, Australia, and has an elevation of 316 metres (1,037 ft) above sea level. The mountain is located near the Pacific Highway, south of the town of Grafton and approximately 6 kilometres (3.7 mi) west north-west of the locality of Calamia.

Glenugie Peak is known as Gunayjun to the local Gumbaynggirr people.

== Features and location ==
Glenugie peak is composed mainly of Cenozoic-aged dolerite The dolerites of Glenugie Peak were extruded from the Grafton Formation, a series of sedimentary rocks laid down between the late Jurassic and early Cretaceous periods.

Glenugie Peak is noted by Matthew Norman for its dry rainforest in a gully which includes a number of rare species of trees, as well as the yellow box, which is more often associated with areas west of the Great Dividing Range. Average annual rainfall is 1,138 millimetres (44.8 in).

Stone quarried from the slopes of Glenugie peak was used as ballast for the North Coast railway line and remnants of the tramway used to transport the rock can still be seen today.

== See also ==
- List of mountains of Australia § New South Wales
