= Lachlan Fold Belt =

Geological feature in Australia

The Lachlan Fold Belt (LFB) or Lachlan Orogen is a geological subdivision of the east part of Australia. It is a zone of folded and faulted rocks of similar age. It dominates New South Wales and Victoria, also extending into Tasmania, the Australian Capital Territory and Queensland. It was formed in the Middle Paleozoic from 450 to 340 Mya. It was earlier known as Lachlan Geosyncline. It covers an area of 200,000 km^{2}.

== Characteristics ==
=== Location ===
The Lachlan Fold Belt is bordered on the west by the Delamerian Orogen from the early Palaeozoic (550 to 470 Mya). On the east side is found the Narooma Accretionary Complex (or Narooma terrane) from 445 Mya, and the New England Orogen from the late Palaeozoic to early Mesozoic. These boundary orogens along with the Lachlan Orogen make up the Tasman Orogenic system in Australia, which along with the extension into the neighbouring parts of Gondwana make up the Tasmanides. North of the Lachlan Fold belt is the Thomson Orogen in the north-east and centre of Queensland. Sometimes the Lachlan Orogen is included with the Thomson Orogen and known as the 'Lachlan–Thomson Orogen'. The Great Artesian Basin has been laid down over the top of the LFB in north-western New South Wales and western Queensland and the Murray–Darling basin covers the south-west of New South Wales. The Sydney Basin is on the top of the LFB around Sydney and Wollongong on the east coast of New South Wales.

In Victoria the western limit of the LFB is defined by the Stawell–Ararat Fault. Westwards of this fault is the Moornambool Metamorphic Complex.

=== Classification ===
The orogen is of the accretionary or 'Turkic' type. It has also been classified as a 'Carpathian'-type orogen, i.e. one where subduction rate is greater than that of plate convergence. In such a case the 'hinge', at which subduction starts, tend to move further seawards over time (rollback).

=== Shape ===
The Tasman Line outlines the Precambrian margin of eastern Australia. The Delamerian Orogen follows this line, and the western side of the Lachlan Orogen also follows this curve. The central and east parts of the Orogen are aligned in a north–south direction.

=== Size ===
At the present time the fold belt is about 1,000 km wide. However, the original width was 2,000 to 3,000 km wide, with the excess size absorbed by folding and thrusting.

=== Structure ===
Rock beds are folded in chevron folds. They are cut by thin-skinned thrusts. Other faults separate the different terranes making up the orogen.

Before the concept of plate tectonics was accepted, the LFB was described as the Lachlan Geosyncline.

The concept of terranes has been applied to the LFB with the term Lachlan superterrane being used for the Lachlan Mudpile. Geomagnetic poles cannot be reliably determined for Devonian or older rocks thanks to the folding. In Victoria van den Berg used the terms Whitelaw terrane for the Western Lachlan, and Benambra terrane for the Central and Eastern Lachlan.

Other terrane subdivision have included Melbourne, Stawell, Howqua and Girilambone terranes, as well as Cowra, Tumut and Hill End troughs; Parkes and Molong Zones; and the Wagga Omeo Belt.

==== Orogenies ====
Most of the LFB was greatly affected by the Late Ordovician to Early Silurian Benambran Orogeny (also led to the formation of the Wagga–Omeo Zone). The Middle Devonian Tabberabberan Orogeny affected the entire LFB and terminated the precratonic stage of its development. The Carboniferous Kanimblan Orogeny was the terminal event and converted the LFB into a neocraton.

=== Metamorphism ===
There are two high-temperature, low-pressure regions of metamorphism. The Wagga Omeo Metamorphic Belt is a large region in the Central Lachlan between the Kancoona-Kiera Shear Zone and the Gilmore Shear Zone. Other metamorphic complexes are Kuark, Camblong, Cooma and Jerangle in the eastern side. These zones made up the Eastern Metamorphic Belt, named by Vallance in 1969. In these high-temperature belts, the temperature peaked at 700 °C and the pressure was 350 MPa, with a thermal gradient of 65 °/km. This same high-temperature regime produced migmatite and S-type granite from the Ordovician sediments.

Blueschist formed by intermediate to high-pressure metamorphism is found in melange at Port Sorell and the Arthur Lineament in Tasmania, and Howqua Melange and Heathcote Melange in Victoria.

Slate has been formed in other parts of the fold belt indicating intermediate pressure and low temperature.

=== Plutonism ===
Granite plutons have formed in many parts of the LFB where there has been significant heating. They were formed at the time of extension, when hot asthenosphere rose towards the surface. Granites cover 61,000 km^{2}. There are 875 lithological units of granite. There are 100 volcanic units derived from the same magma as the granites.

== History ==
The basement of the belt is Cambrian oceanic crust which was formed in a back arc basin or a fore arc basin. An ancient shoreline of Australia, called the cratonic margin existed off the east coast of the Delamerian Orogen in western New South Wales, western Victoria and western Tasmania. In the early Ordovician there was a shallow marine shelf called the Gnalta Shelf, over the top of the Koonenberry Belt near Broken Hill. At the same time there were marine conditions in Amadeus Basin where Horn Valley siltstone was formed, and Georgina Basin where the Coolibah Formation deposited. The Larapintine Sea formed a shallow marine connection through central Australia to the Canning Basin in Western Australia. Sediments formed on the continental shelf of the continent from this time appear in western Tasmania and north west New South Wales. A subduction zone consumed the Pacific crust below the Delamerian coast, but this subduction moved 1,000 km oceanwards. An island arc was formed on the northern end of the 900-kilometre-long trench. This was the Macquarie Volcanic Arc.

Between the continent and the island arc or trench, deep water sediments in the form of turbidites appeared in the Central Lachlan Orogen. These were derived from the western Delamerian Orogen and from the south west Ross Orogen, which is now left behind in Antarctica.

The Ordovician volcanoes of the arc are now found around Parkes, Wellington, Molong and east of Condobolin, Cowra and Boorowa. The east Lachlan Orogen containing Adaminaby Group Turbidites is now to the east and south of the Macquarie Arc. All its boundaries with the Macquarie Arc are faults, indicating that this is a separate terrane, also known as the Adaminaby superterrane. In the Late Ordovician the turbidites were overlaid by a black shale. The back arc region was extended at this time.

Between 447 to 443 million years ago in the Ordovician to Silurian, the arc collided with the back arc, ending the Benambran Cycle. The turbidites were deformed, biotite formed, and the arc was thrust over or under the turbidites.

In the Middle Silurian, the Pacific plate boundary moved a few hundred km to the east. A new subduction zone dipping westwards lasted from the end of the Silurian into the Late Devonian. The whole of the Lachlan Fold Belt became a back arc area with a new volcanic arc formed to the east in what is now the New England Orogen. Extension stretched the LFB, forming rifts and shelves, along with intrusion of granites and volcanism. This was the Tabberabberan Orogeny.

Deformation happened in the west 450 to 395 Mya and in the east 400 to 380 Mya. Extensional basins occur in the central and east parts of the fold belt. Oceanic subduction (or underthrusting) is evidenced for the western and central parts by slivers of ophiolite and blueschist metamorphism. These are known as Coolac serpentinite, and Honeysuckle Beds east of Tumut; the Kiandra Beds north of Batlow and the Tumut Pond Serpentinite Belt on the west side of Talbingo Dam.

The Narooma terrane migrated 2,500 km westwards on the moving Pacific plate and became attached to the Adaminaby superterrane in Silurian times. Conodont fossils in the Narooma Chert prove the age of the terrane to be from late Cambrian to middle Ordovician. The Narooma terrane exposure is between Narooma and Eurobodalla and also between Burewarra Point and Durras around Batemans Bay on the south coast of New South Wales.

The western parts under New South Wales and Queensland are mostly heavily weathered and or covered in younger sediments of the Great Artesian Basin or Great Australian Basin and Murray–Darling basin. The underlying structure can still be explored through magnetic, gravity and seismic geophysical measurements.

About 84 million years ago the Tasman Sea started to form by seafloor spreading. This split off a segment of the coast to form the Lord Howe Rise, part of Zealandia. Around then, Bass Strait was extended moving Tasmania away from the rest of Australian mainland.

== Lithology ==
Turbidites from submarine fans, trench complexes, volcanic arcs, oceanic crust and micro continents dominate lithological components. The individual rock types are mostly sandstone and shale interbedded, with chert, and metavolcanics.

== Subdivisions ==
Three broad subdivisions of Lachlan Fold Belt are Western, Central and Eastern. The Western Lachlan, which lies in Victoria includes the Stawell and Melbourne Zones. The eastern boundary of the Western Lachlan is the Mount Wellington–Mount Useful Fault Zone (east of Melbourne). The Central Lachlan includes the Tabberabbera Zone and the Wagga-Omeo Metamorphic Belt. The Eastern Lachlan extends to the east of the Gilmore Fault Zone, a shear zone on the edge of the WOMB.

The Macquarie Volcanic Arc formed about 1000 km off the coast. The Yarrimbah Formation is exposed west of Parkes. It consists of siliceous siltstones, formed in deep water. It is the most western part of the Arc. The Rockley–Gulgong Volcanic Belt. Budhang Chert Member is found near Oberon. The Molong Volcanic Belt lies between Cowra and Boorowa. The Adaminaby Group, from another terrane, was thrust northwards over the top of the Molong Volcanic Belt. The Kenyu Formation is from Late Ordovician and contains conglomerate. The Wagga Belt rocks are thrust eastwards over the top of the Junee–Narromine Volcanic Belt of the Macquarie arc.

=== Western Lachlan Orogen ===
The upper crust contains chevron-folded turbidites.

The lower crust contains duplexed oceanic lithosphere, and magmatic underplating.

=== Eastern Lachlan Orogen ===
Structures in the Eastern thrust belt are oriented north–south. It has thick-skinned deformation in the west and thin-skinned deformation in the east.

== Economically significant mineralisation ==
Sites within the Lachlan Fold Belt have been associated with economically significant production of gold, copper, silver, lead, zinc and tin. There remains potential for further mineral discoveries.
