= Hunter–Bowen orogeny =

The Hunter–Bowen orogeny was a significant arc accretion event in the Permian and Triassic periods affecting approximately 2,500 km of the Australian continental margin.

The Hunter–Bowen orogeny occurred in two main phases: The first being Permian accretion of passive-marginal Devonian- and Carboniferous-age sediments, occurring in the Hunter region, as well as the mid-west region of what is now New South Wales, followed by rifting, back-arc volcanism. The later Permian to Triassic event consisted of arc accretion and metamorphism related to ongoing subduction.

The Hunter–Bowen orogeny is today represented by a geological structure known as the New England Fold Belt, a tectonic accretion of metamorphic terranes and mid-crustal granitoid intrusions, flanked by Permian to Triassic sedimentary basins which were formed distally to the now-eroded orogenic mountain belt.

While the Great Dividing Range north of Sydney is a prominent landform, it is more the result of Cenozoic volcanism and crustal uplift since the Jurassic, which broadly affects the same area as the Hunter–Bowen orogeny did. Gravity, magnetics and bathymetry indicate that several slivers of crust formerly from the Hunter–Bowen orogeny are now spread out across the Indo-Australian plate east of the Australian continental landmass, forming some isolated submerged ocean plateaux and islands, notably Lord Howe Rise which includes Lord Howe Island. Lord Howe Rise has a total area of about 1,500,000 square km.

== Prior tectonics ==
The Hunter–Bowen orogeny produced a ~3,000 km long structural foredeep above a Late Carboniferous and Palaeozoic margin, adjacent to the weakly consolidated Australian continental crust which at this time was part of Gondwana. The orogen developed to the east of the Palaeozoic Lachlan Orogen and the Proterozoic terranes of the Mount Isa Inlier.

Before the orogeny the rocks of the coastal area were formed. During the Late Carboniferous there was a continental margin defined by a subduction zone off the coast. The oceanic plate that was being subducted hosted a series of magmatic arcs; now represented by the Connors Arch, Auburn Arch, Combarrago Volcanics and the Bathurst Batholith. A forearc basin is preserved in the Tamworth Belt and Yarrol Belt. Subduction resulted in blueschist metamorphism of the subducted slab. At 309 Ma an oceanic ridge encountered the subduction boundary at two points, near what is now Tin Can Bay and Coffs Harbour. These encounters interrupted subduction at those locations and resulted in the formation of triple junctions, which began moving apart north and south along the trench, eventually being replaced by a dextral transform fault.

The northernmost triple junction, a ridge-trench-fault junction, moved up the Queensland coast at 28 mm per year, reaching Townsville about 290 Ma. As it moved, the magmatism inland reduced drastically due to interruption of subduction. The other triple junction, a fault-trench-fault junction, moved south from Brisbane at about 12 mm per year. The triple junctions in the New England region stopped subduction very quickly because the mid ocean ridge was almost parallel to the trench. The merging of the subduction zone and the ridge converted the trench to a transform fault, ceasing subduction-related volcanism. Between these two ridge-trench encounter points, a small triangular shaped plate continued to subduct between Brisbane and Coffs Harbour. Thus time was available to build up a thick subduction wedge.

== Megafold ==
The Texas-Coffs Harbour megafold resulted from dextral motion (clockwise) along a major fault in eastern Queensland. The hypothetical fault, which is not exposed at the surface, is called the Gogango-Baryulgil fault zone. The coastal terrane which stretches from Coffs Harbour in the south to Broad Sound near St Lawrence, Queensland in the north, underwent 500 km of southerly displacement. This brought it into its current position relative to the rest of Australia, and formed a major structural fold inland from Coffs Harbour. The movement may have been caused by absorption of lateral motion between the northern pair of triple junctions. The megafold formed around 290 Ma (early Permian) and took from 10 to 20 million years.

Around this terrane some areas of extension happened on the main craton, creating several basins up to 2 km deep. The Texas region is one such sedimentary basin.

Around 280 Ma in the early Permian, the relative oceanic plate movement changed direction and the continental margin again became convergent. This may have been due to distant continental collisions in the buildup of Pangea. Arc volcanism occurred in central Queensland, forming the Lizzie Creek Volcanics and the Camboon Volcanics. Minor extension in these units formed the Grantleigh Trough, an intra-arc rift. The subduction zone was aligned with the north-east coast of Queensland, with a back arc basin formed to the east of the Hunter region, called the Barnard Basin. Deposition continued in basins around 270 Ma into the Permian, but volcanic activity was reduced.

== Sydney-Gunnedah-Bowen Basin ==
This structural foredeep filled with marine deepwater sediments and later fluviatile sandstones, which during the Permian and Triassic formed vast accumulations of coal from entrapped organic matter. The Sydney and Bowen Basins were flanked by an offshore island arc system during continued accretion and subduction during the Permian.

Thrusting of the Permian sequences westward in a Rocky Mountains-style foreland basin system continued as metamorphism began affecting the lower parts of the offshore island arcs, composed primarily of Devonian marine sediments of continental origin, and Carboniferous flysch. Metamorphism resulted in the generation of S-type and I-type granites, which intruded the Palaeozoic sedimentary sequence in the New England Fold Belt. To the north, significant thin-skinned deformation affected the Carboniferous Marlborough and Yarrol Terranes, resulting in magmatism and restricted granite emplacement.

The subduction zone was curved in an arc, resulting in compression in the west-southwest east-northeast direction as well as sinistral shear in the New England district. A continental fragment may have collided with the area, pushing off the Hastings Block and fracturing the Barnard Basin.

The results of the Hunter–Bowen event were:

- Deformation,
  - Metamorphism of both greenschist and rare blueschist facies
  - Thrust faulting
  - Transtension pull-apart basins such as the
    - Esk Trough, a thin pull-apart rift infill fluvial coal-bearing basin
    - Clarence Moreton Basin, including the Ipswich Basin
  - Transpressional faulting and widespread deformation
- Arc volcanism, namely in the Gympie province, offshore of the Hunter valley and Sydney Basin,
- Back-arc basin formation,
  - Gunnedah Basin
  - Sydney basin
  - Bowen Basin
- Granite emplacement,
  - New England I-type and S-type suites during accretion (330–260 Ma)
  - Gympie M-type and I-type suites in back-arc position (4 suites; 260–245; 240–235, 231–225 and 220–215 Ma)
- Andesite, rhyolite and basalt volcanism,
  - In-arc at the Permo-Triassic boundary
  - Back-arc in the early to mid Triassic
- Gold, tin, tungsten mineralisation in the Gympie Block, the New England orogen and throughout the Queensland hinterlands,
- Coal formation in the Sydney basin, Esk Trough, Gunnedah Basin, Bowen Basin and Ipswich Basin

=== Geochronology ===
Geochronology has identified several episodes of deformation, accretion, subduction and magmatism within the Gympie Block:

- Deformation occurred at 250–240 Ma
- Tholeiitic suite of magmatism, including M-type and I-type granites at ~250–245 Ma
- Transitional tholeiitic to calc-alkaline granite and andesite suite ~245–240 Ma
- I-type granite suite and basalt suite ~229 Ma associated with gold mineralisation
- Late I-type and S-type high-level caldera complexes 225–221 Ma

== See also ==
- Geology of Australia
- Orogeny
- Subduction zone
- Shear (geology)
- Bundook beds
