= Geology of Zambia =

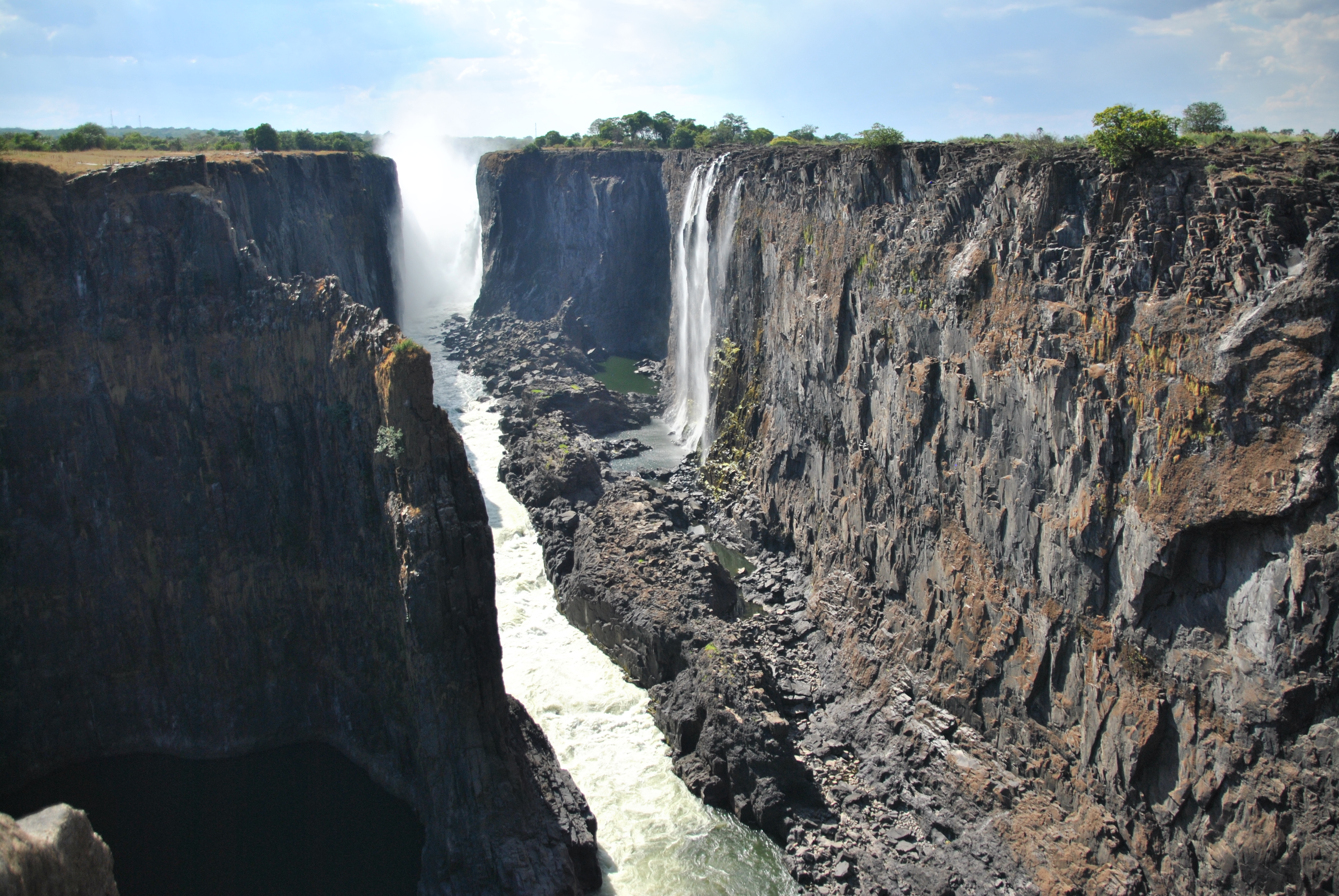
Zambezi River and Victoria Falls in Zambia

The geological history of Zambia begins in the Proterozoic eon of the Precambrian. The igneous and metamorphic basement rocks tend to be highly metamorphosed and may have formed earlier in the Archean, but heat and pressure has destroyed evidence of earlier conditions. Major sedimentary and metamorphic groups formed in the mid-Proterozoic, followed by a series of glaciations in the Neoproterozoic and much of the Paleozoic which deposited glacial conglomerate as well as other sediments to form the Katanga Supergroup and rift-related Karoo Supergroup. Basalt eruptions blanketed the Karoo Supergroup in the Mesozoic and Zambia shifted to coal and sandstone formation. Geologically recent windblown sands from the Kalahari Desert and alluvial deposits near rivers play an important role in the modern surficial geology of Zambia. The country has extensive natural resources, particularly copper, but also cobalt, emeralds, other gemstones, uranium and coal.

== Stratigraphy and geologic history ==
The oldest rocks in Zambia are part of the crystalline Precambrian basement complex, outcropping in the east and as the structurally complex Lufubu System in the Copperbelt. The granite, gneiss, migmatite, schist, amphibolite, charnockite, granulite, khondalite, phyllite, limestone and metaquartzite basement rocks date to the Paleoproterozoic. Due to extensive metamorphism and deformation, they were altered from older rocks, obscuring the geologic history of the region. Additionally, the basement rocks are intruded by other granites, syenite, dolerite, gabbro, rhyolite, andesite, metavolcanic and ultrabasic rocks. Although primarily exposed in the north and east, dome outcrops of basement rock exist at other locations in the country.

A one billion year Proterozoic unconformity separates the basement rock from the conglomerate, quartzite, schists, iron-rich sandstones and mudstones of the Muva Supergroup. The supergroup is intruded by carbonatite, dolerite, granite, granite porphyry, lamprophyre, norite, pegmatite and other igneous rock types. A rhyolite porphyritic belt, formed at the same time as the Muva Supergroup extends along the eastern bank of the Luapula River, between Lake Tanganyika and Lake Mweru.

In the Neoproterozoic, the Katanga Supergroup deposited conglomerate, shale, argillite, quartzite, arkose, greywacke, dolomite and aeolian sandstones unconformably atop both the Muva Supergroup and Precambrian basement rocks.

=== Paleozoic ===
The deposition of the Katanga Supergroup continued into the Cambrian, in parallel with the rapid expansion of multi-cellular life. Geologists divide the supergroup into the Roan Group, Mwasha Group and Kundelungu Group in the Copperbelt, and simply into upper and lower units elsewhere. The Roan Group hosts much of the copper in the Copperbelt as chalcopyrite, chalcocite, bornite, malachite and azurite, in shale, sandstone, dolomite and quartzite associated with the margins of the Kafue syncline.

The Kundelungu Group dolomites, limestones and carbonaceous shales unconformably overly the Mwasha Group shale, argillite and interbedded quartzites. The lower unit of the Kundelungu Group is a conglomerate formed from glacial sediments, potentially related to the Hirnantian glaciation in the Ordovician, as Zambia, within the supercontinent Gondwana drifted close to the South Pole.

In the mid-Paleozoic, a large rift valley formed across southern Gondwana, spanning much of what is now southern Africa and southern South America. The Karoo Supergroup, the most widespread stratigraphic unit in southern Africa, deposited in the rift. In Zambia, the Karoo Supergroup is represented by outcrops in major rift block valleys, in the east and south, such as the Luangwa, Lukusashi, Lunsemfwa, Rufunsa and mid-Zambezi rivers. Because glaciations continued throughout much of the Paleozoic, into the Permian, in Gondwana, the bottom sequence of Karoo Supergroup rocks is a tillite that appears to be glacially produced. Ascending units includes sandstones and the Gwembe Coal Formation, mudstones and additional sandstones.

=== Mesozoic-Cenozoic (251 million years ago-present) ===
Deposition of the Karoo Supergroup continued into the Mesozoic, with the sequence capped by basalt lava flows from the Jurassic. Today, the basalt is exposed on the walls of Batoka Gorge, below Victoria Falls.

The Karoo Supergroup is overlain by Late Jurassic and Cretaceous sandstones and mudstone, and intruded by carbonatite and kimberlite.

During the past 66 million years of the Cenozoic, the Kalahari Desert underwent a major expansion during a long lasting dry period. In the Neogene through the Pleistocene, this climate change deposited moderately consolidated sandstones and windblown sands as the Kalahari Group in the Western Province and other parts of northwest, south and central Zambia. Pleistocene and Holocene alluvial deposits line the major rivers, as well as the Bangweulu Swamps and Kafue Flats.

== Hydrogeology ==
Quaternary alluvial aquifers and the 20 to 40 meter unconsolidated sands of the Kalahari Group, in western and northeastern Zambia are recharged by rainwater, although the Kalahari Group has some issues with brackish water.

Several units of the Katanga Supergroup form consolidated, fracture flow aquifers in the Roan dolomite, Kundelungu limestone, Roan quartzites and Muva Supergroup. Brackish water is held in the unconfined, high porosity Karoo Group sandstones. By contrast, Karoo basalts, interbedded with sandstones and recharged through fractures tend to yield high quality water.

Large parts of the country are underlain by granite and gabbro crystalline basement rock. These rocks are generally impermeable, but store water in 10 to 15 meter thick weathered regolith and fractures.

== Natural resource geology ==
Zambia has extensive natural resources, most famously the copper ore of the Roan Group, which gave rise to the Copperbelt region. Until the rapid decline in copper prices in the mid-1970s, copper mining formed the backbone of the economy of Zambia. Demand has picked up for copper, along with secondary production of cobalt. The country has deposits of iron, zinc, lead and tin, as well as small scale gemstone mining from basement rock. The Ndola area has emerald, aquamarine, garnet and talc.

Lower Karoo rocks host coal, while Upper Karoo rocks contain uranium.

== See also ==
- Bangweulu Block
- Mporokoso Group
- Hook granite massif
- Mwembeshi Shear Zone
- Zambezi Belt
- Lufilian Arc
