= Geology of the Democratic Republic of the Congo =

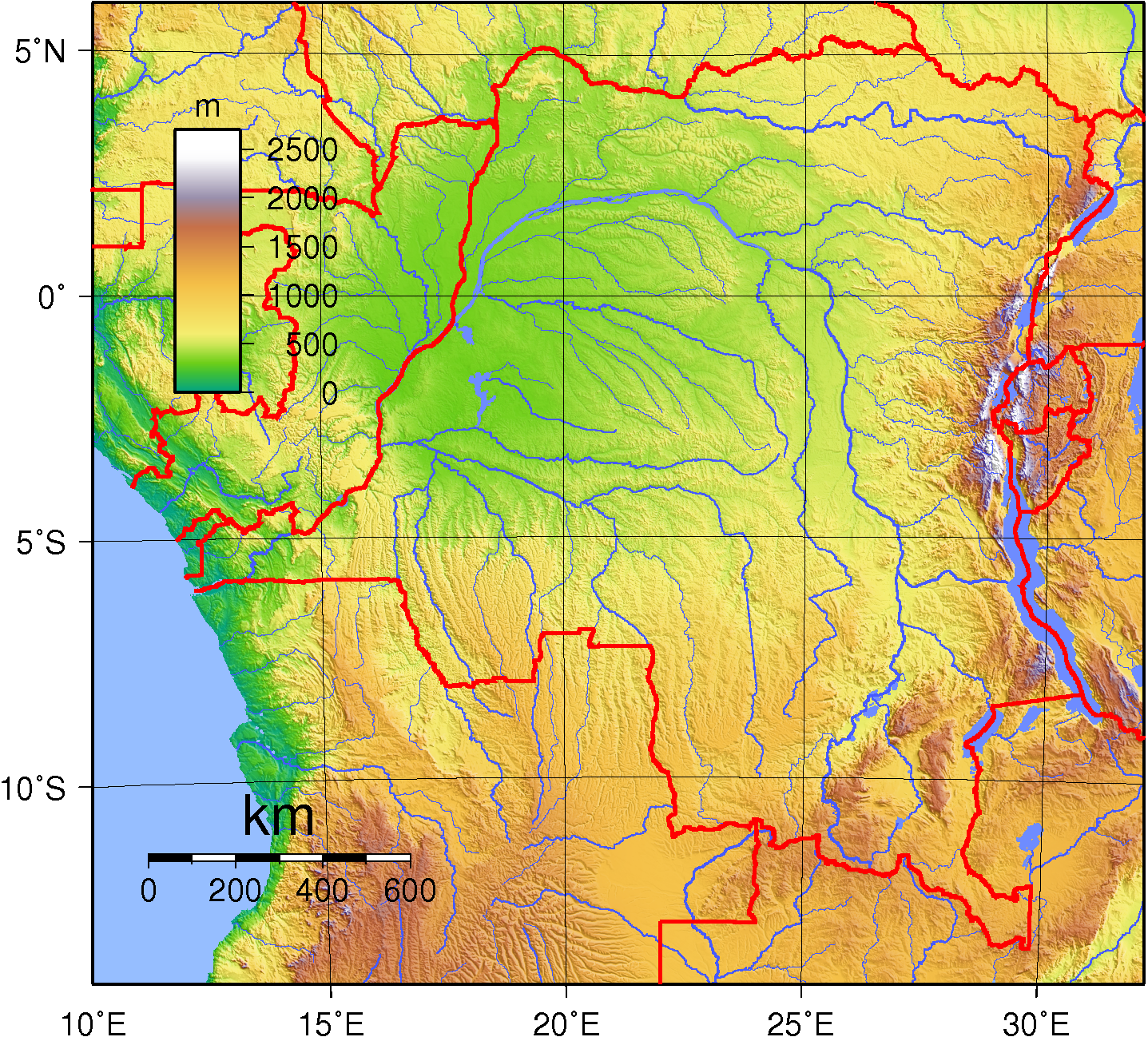
Topographic map of the Democratic Republic of the Congo

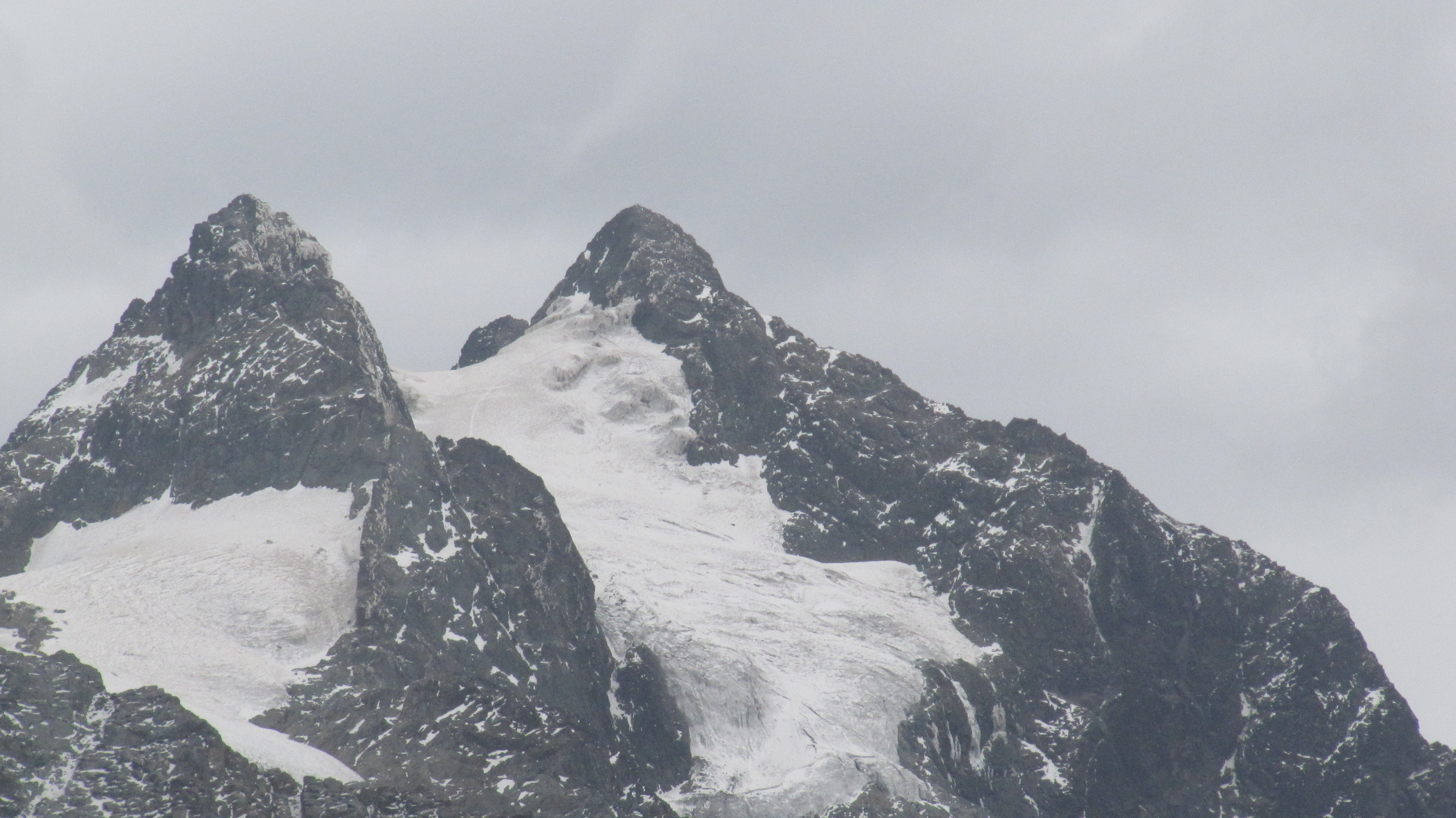
Mount Stanley on the border with Uganda

The geology of the Democratic Republic of the Congo (DRC or Congo-Kinshasa, formerly Zaire and Belgian Congo) is extremely old, on the order of several billion years for many rocks. The country spans the Congo Craton: a stable section of ancient continental crust, deformed and influenced by several different mountain building orogeny events, sedimentation, volcanism and the geologically recent effects of the East African Rift System in the east. The country's complicated tectonic past have yielded large deposits of gold, diamonds, coltan and other valuable minerals.

== Stratigraphy, tectonics and geologic history ==
Map of Western Gondwana with the Congo Craton

Archean terranes in the Congo Craton are exposed as part of the Angolan Shield in Kasai Province, the foreland of the West Congolian mobile belt in the northwest and as granite and greenstone belts spanning into neighboring Central African Republic, Uganda and South Sudan.

=== Angolan Shield ===
In Kasai, the metamorphic basement rocks of the Angolan Shield are bounded by a fault at 4 degrees south latitude, with underlying poorly exposed migmatite and gneiss and overlying rocks from the past 541 million years of the Phanerozoic. The oldest rocks in the DRC are the 3.4 billion year old Upper Luanyi granite gneiss, which contains pegmatites, metamorphosed to amphibolite grade metamorphic facies. Faults are believed to separate these rocks from the Kanda Kanda gneisses, which contain lenses of pink alaskite gneiss, probably formed near granulite grade metamorphism and originating from charnockite, gabbro and norite rocks in the Kasai-Lomami group. Geologists estimate that the Kanda Kanda gneisses are formed between 3.4 and 2.82 billion years ago.

The Kasai-Lomami group has two rock units. One is a mafic unit with gabbro, norite, amphibolite and anorthosite. Taken together, they are the remains of magma intrusions metamorphosed to granulite grade. The second unit contains dark gneiss and aluminium-rich granulite, which may have originated from sediments, along with metadolerite dikes. The metamorphism and deformation that affected both units likely happened 2.8 billion years ago.

=== Foreland basin: West Congolian mobile belt ===
The West Congolian mobile belt became a foreland basin during the Pan-African orogeny and forms the granitoid Chaillu Massif spanning into the Republic of Congo through Gabon. The massif has a north–south foliation and two generations of granitoids. Gray granodiorite shifts to quartz, diorite, biotite and amphibolite-rich types, cut by veins of pink, potassic migmatite. The Chaillu Massif granitoids are 2.7 billion years old and engulfed pre-existing schist and greenstone.

=== Northeast Congo Craton ===
In northeastern DRC, Archean gneisses and granite-greenstones terranes are common. The Bomu Gneissic Complex and the West Nile Gneissic Complex basement gneiss rocks are 3.5 billion year old, while the more scattered Ganguan Greenstone Belt in the west and the Kibalian Greenstone Belt in the east formed between 3.2 and 2.6 billion years ago. The Bomu Gneissic Complex outcrops near the Bomu River and the Uele River at the border with the Central African Republic. Out of four named types of gneiss, the Bomu gneiss, rich in amphibolite and pyroxene is the largest group in a synform structure in northern DRC. The different gneisses probably began to form 3.5 billion years ago from oceanic source material and were later intruded by tonalite around 3.41 billion years ago.

Granulite rocks in the same region as the West Nile Gneissic Complex pre-date the Watian orogeny 2.9 billion years ago and contain charnockitic dolerite dikes, with isoclinal folding of the rock. After the Watian orogeny, volcanic and sedimentary rocks in what is now northeast DRC metamorphosed into the Western Gray Gneissic Group with biotite, hornblende and microlite. The subsequent Aruan orogeny 2.68 billion years ago gave these rocks a northeast plunging fold.

The Ganguan Greenstone Belt is 3.2 billion years old and contains sericite quartzites, quartz phyllite, talc schist poor in quartz and chlorite schist. The Kibalian Greenstone Belt appears at surface level to be separate belts, divided up by the Upper Congo Granitoid Massif, but geologists believe it is actually a continuous greenstone belt with mafic and intermediate volcanic rocks in the west and banded iron formations in the east. Granitoid rocks are the most common in northeastern DRC, probably formed from monzonite granites and tonalites.

=== Neoproterozoic (1 Ga to 542 Ma) ===
The Lufilian Arc, now located between central Zambia and DRC's Shaba Province formed in an extension zone in the Neoproterozoic, during the Damara-Lufilian-Zambezi orogeny. The Lufilian Arc separates the Congo Craton from the Kalahari Craton and the Bangweulu Craton and overprints alignments in the rock from the Kibaran orogeny and the Irumide orogeny 1.3 to 1.1 billion years ago. Beginning 875 million years ago, up to 10 kilometers of sediment deposited in rift basins and sag basins in Katanga. In Katanga, the bottom of the sedimentary sequence is breccia, overlain by carbonaceous shales, iron formations and the remains of pyroclastic flows in the Mwashya Group. The overlying Kundelungu Supergroup starts off with glacial sedimentary rocks from the Neoproterozoic Snowball Earth event followed by a cap of carbonates.

The sediments in Katanga metamorphosed to greenschist and amphibolite grade during the Pan-African orogeny. Away from the mobile belts, the Congo Craton has large sedimentary rock formations leftover from the molasses areas associated with the different orogenies deep in the past, which include stromatolite and acritarch fossils. Some examples include the dolomitic shales, conglomerates, quartzites, siltstones and shales of the Mbuyi Mayi Supergroup in the southeast or the quartzites and carbonate assemblages of the Lindian Supergroup in the north, formed from stromatolites.

=== Mesozoic and Cenozoic (251 Ma to present) ===
Downwarping of the crust of the Congo Craton in the Mesozoic left the basin to fill with river and lake sediments in the Late Jurassic and Early Cretaceous, forming the Lualaba Series and Kamina Series. The Kwanga Series preserves fossilized freshwater fish and dates to the Late Cretaceous, along with alluvial diamonds at its base, suggesting kimberlite pipe eruptions at the time.

After a long period of relative tectonic quiet, volcanism started in the geologically recent past of the late Cenozoic in the Western Rift of the East African Rift System, at the same time that eruptions began in the Kenyan Rift. The oldest basalt at the base of the Virunga Massif, east of the current rift is 14 million years old. Alkaline basalts erupted from 13 million to nine million years ago. In the late Pliocene, the fracture pattern changed to northeast–southwest, building up a chain of volcanic mountains formed from potassic, undersaturated lava.

The Wembo-Nyama ring structure in Omeonga is a possible impact crater in DRC, the World Impact Crater list by Anna Mikheeva lists it as "potential".

== Hydrogeology ==
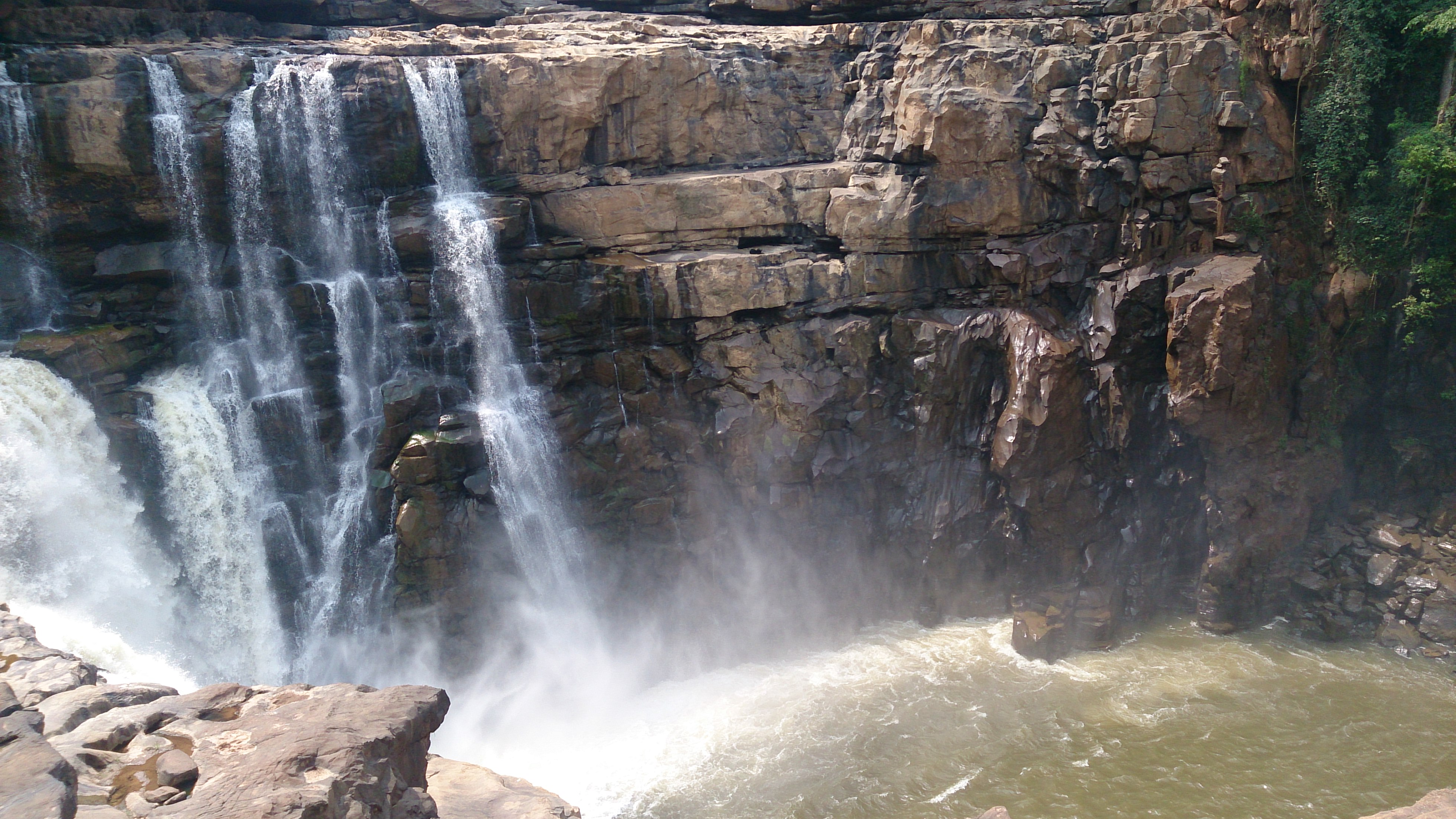
Zongo falls in DRC

The hydrogeology of DRC is poorly researched, although individual areas have been studied since the 1950s. Alluvial sand and gravel aquifers are common throughout the country. One unit in Oubangui and Cuvette Centrale is 120 metres (390 ft) thick, recharging rapidly from rainfall and river water. A large aquifer underlying the Batekes Plateau in southeast Kasai, in sandy loam and soft sandstone has poor recharge and transmissivity but sustains the baseflow of many different streams.

Other aquifers are situated in Cretaceous sandstones, Cape orogeny related Mesozoic-Paleozoic sandstones (which are significant near Gemena and Kisangani) and often recharge rapidly. The Lubumbashi dolomites in southern Katanga can be highly productive, although the presence of schist and gypsum in the carbonates sometimes results in high mineralization. Three main aquifers in the Watsa area in Oriental Province are in fractured Precambrian crystalline basement rock.

== Natural hazards ==
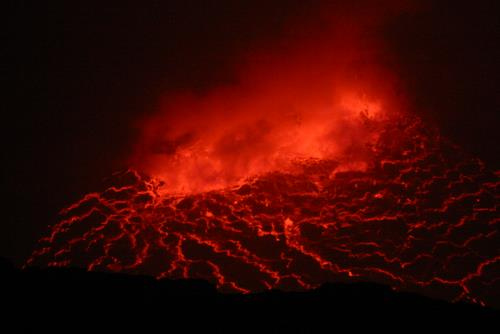
Nyiragongo lava lake in 2005

Eastern DRC has several active volcanoes. The eruption of Mount Nyiragongo in January, 2002, killed 45 people in the major eastern city of Goma and lava flows destroyed the city's airport flowing toward Lake Kivu. The eruption of Mount Nyamulagira on November 27, 2006, did not result in significant fatalities.

Mining in southern provinces like Katanga has seriously polluted some of DRC's aquifers.

== Natural resource geology ==
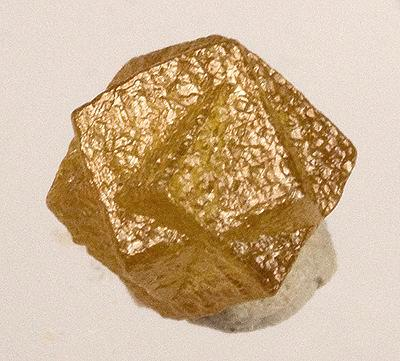
Diamond from the DRC Photo by Rob Lavinsky

Historically, the economy of the Democratic Republic of Congo hinged on the mining industry, particularly in colonial times and immediately after independence. However, Congolese metal mining virtually collapsed as a result of the Second Congo Civil War. The Lufilian Arc hosts the famous copperbelt region that spans from Katanga into Zambia, with 12% of the world's copper and half of all cobalt reserves. Within the polymetallic metallogenic province, there are stratiform, skarn and vein deposits with copper-cobalt and zinc-lead sulfides, noble metals and chlorine oxides. DRC has 3.1 million tons out of the 4.8 million tons of cobalt reserves in the copperbelt.

Political unrest and obsolete equipment caused a precipitous drop in gold production. In the early 1990s, many large mines closed. Kipushi Mine, a copper, zinc and germanium mine near Lubumbashi shut down in 1993, although feasibility studies indicated potential for producing up to 200,000 tons of copper a year prompting the possibility that it might be reopened. Some mines were shut down even earlier, such as a manganese mine in Kisenge closed in the 1970s after the Angolan Civil War shutdown the Benguela railroad used to export ore. Coal production at the Luena Mine in Shaba Province has been curtailed by ethnic conflicts. Coltan, a mix of columbite and tantalite is common in eastern DRC, which yields tantalum when refined. With soaring demand for tantalum capacitors in cellphones, computers and other electronics, prices of the metal increased rapidly. Artisanal mining, often associated with rebels involved in the Kivu conflict has arisen to meet international demand.

DRC also has large diamond deposits, mainly extracted through artisanal mining of alluvium near Mbuji-Mayi in Kasai Province, although many of these reserves are becoming depleted. One third of the DRC's diamonds are smuggled out of the country every year.

Limestone occurs in Kongo Central, Équateur and Haut-Katanga provinces.

== See also ==
- Geology of the Republic of the Congo
