= Mwembeshi Shear Zone =

Ductile shear zone across Zambia

Coordinates: 15°40′1″S 27°48′0″E

The Mwembeshi Shear Zone is a ductile shear zone about 550 million years old that extends ENE–WSW across Zambia. In Zambia, it separates the Lufilian Belt to the northwest from the Zambezi Belt to the southeast. It is associated with a sinistral strike slip movement.

The Mwembeshi Shear Zone lies between the Congo craton to the NW and the Kalahari craton to the SE, to the west (in today's orientation) of the Mozambique Belt, which is on the north and east side of the Kalahari Craton. It was formed during the Pan-African orogeny when "North" and "South" Gondwana were amalgamated along the Kuunga orogeny zone between 580 Ma and 480 Ma. The date of around 550 Ma for the Mwembeshi shear zone is based on U-Pb zircon ages of syntectonic granites from the Hook massif and of associated hypabyssal rhyolite.

During the amalgamation there was sinistral transpression along the boundary between the Kalahari craton and the Congo and Tanzanian cratons (which had already amalgamated), which is now expressed as the Mwembeshi Shear Zone. The sinistral sense shows that, in modern coordinates, the Congo-Sao Francisco Craton approached the remainder of southwestern Gondwana from the north, although at the time southwestern Gondwana was oriented about 90 degrees clockwise of today's orientation, and the Congo Craton approached from the east. There was little vertical displacement, but Mwembeshi is a major sinistral transcurrent shear zone. The shear zone accommodates a change in the structural vergence between the Zambezi Belt and the Lufilian Arc. Further to the southwest, the shear zone extends along part at least of the Damaran belt.

There are known to be basic connections between geological terranes and mineralization models, so understanding the Mwembeshi Shear Zone is important to understanding where mineral resources may be found in the region. Despite this, as of 1990 there had been relatively little exploration.
