= Geology of Mozambique =

The geology of Mozambique is primarily extremely old Precambrian metamorphic and igneous crystalline basement rock, formed in the Archean and Proterozoic, in some cases more than two billion years ago. Mozambique contains greenstone belts and spans the Zimbabwe Craton, a section of ancient stable crust. The region was impacted by major tectonic events, such as the mountain building Irumide orogeny, Pan-African orogeny and the Snowball Earth glaciation. Large basins that formed in the last half-billion years have filled with extensive continental and marine sedimentary rocks, including rocks of the extensive Karoo Supergroup which exist across Southern Africa. In some cases these units are capped by volcanic rocks. As a result of its complex and ancient geology, Mozambique has deposits of iron, coal, gold, mineral sands, bauxite, copper and other natural resources.

== Stratigraphy, tectonics and geologic history ==
The oldest rocks in Mozambique are part of the Irumide Belt, outcropping near the border with Zimbabwe. Over two billion years old, these rocks date to the Archean and Paleoproterozoic and are an extension of greenstone belts and granite-gneisses, within the Zimbabwe Craton.

The schist of the greenstone belt is divided between the Manica Group, Gairezi Group and Umkondo Group, which together are the oldest individual rock units in the country. The formation of these schists and the Irumide Belt is tied to the Irumide orogeny about 1.35 billion years ago.

=== Proterozoic (2.5 billion-539 million years ago) ===
During the Neoproterozoic, the Pan-African orogeny emplaced granites and pegmatites throughout what is now Mozambique. This 250 million year tectonic event (which continued into the Phanerozoic Eon) overprinted many of the Precambrian rocks in Mozambique. The Snowball Earth global glaciation event 600 million years ago, at the same time as the orogeny began, left glacial sedimentary rocks in the Katangula Group in northwestern Mozambique, which is the same unit as the Katanga Supergroup in the Democratic Republic of the Congo and Zambia.

=== Phanerozoic (539 million-present) ===
As the Pan-African orogeny continued, in parallel with the proliferation of multi-cellular life, a large rift formed across the south of the supercontinent Gondwana across what is now South Africa and southern South America. The Karoo Supergroup, the most widely dispersed stratigraphic unit in southern Africa formed from the Carboniferous through the Early Jurassic in the Mesozoic. The Alto Zambezi Basin, Rio Lunho Basin and Rio Lugenda Basin, large intracratonal basins in Mozambique filled with sedimentary rocks. For the most part, the basins contain sequences of fluvial and glacial sediments, with layers of red mudstone with fossils and some coal layers. The Alto Zambezi Basin is capped by volcanic basalt and rhyolite in the south. Sedimentary rock formation continued in Mozambique along the coasts in the Jurassic, Cretaceous and into the Paleogene and Neogene periods of the Cenozoic, with some sedimentary units formed in the past 2.5 million years of the Quaternary. Sedimentation shifted to different basins, including the Mozambique Basin, Limpopo Basin, Baixa Zambezi Basin and Rovuma Basin.

== Hydrogeology ==
South of the Save River, unconsolidated sediments are an important source of groundwater, overlying the Mozambique Basin. A 30 kilometer wide belt of dune sands occupies the southern coast of the country, atop Cretaceous and Paleogene rocks and form a moderately productive unconfined aquifer. Thick alluvium in the Limpopo River and Incomati River valleys forms a major aquifer in high porosity sands north of Maputo.

Marine and continental sandstones dominate deeper Cretaceous-Paleogene sedimentary aquifers and some also contain layers of limestone. These underlying rocks in the Mozambique Basin form the largest aquifer, beneath 21% of the country. Cut by large river valleys, arkosic sandstones give way to limestone closer to the coast. North of the Save River, the basin is moderately productive, but to the south it has high salinity nearly unusable groundwater for much of its extent. The Rovuma Basin is poorly studied, but impermeable marl and high incidences of brackish groundwater suggest it would not be a major potential source. As much as 57% of Mozambique is directly underlain by Precambrian basement rock, which forms some small and locally productive aquifers in weathered rock near the surface. Mountain areas tend to have thicker weathered mantle, with most productive locations near fault zones. In northern Mozambique, average weathered rock cover is less than 20 meters thick, rising to as much as 50 meters in valleys. Fractured volcanic rocks form locally productive aquifers, producing high quality water, often in 10 to 20 meter thick weathered rock near the surface. However, weathered basalt often ends up with high clay concentrations, limiting productivity.

== Natural resource geology ==
Mozambique has extensive natural resources, although most remain undeveloped. The Manica Belt is a continuation of the Mutare-Manica Gold Belt from Zimbabwe and contains iron, copper, asbestos, gold, lead and nickel hosted in an Archean and Paleoproterozoic greenstone belt. Small mines in the region have targeted placer gold in sediments in the area and there is also a small, high-grade bauxite deposit. The metasediments of Gairezi Group and Umkondo Group both host limestone, copper and iron near the border with Zimbabwe. Mozambique has four asbestos deposits. One has chrysotile asbestos crystals, separated by serpentinite in the Zimbabwe Craton, near Manica. Others are in the Mozambique Belt, or associated with serpentinization south of Manica. Seven out of the nation's 10 provinces have graphite in Proterozoic rock associated with schist and gneiss. Semi-precious stones, feldspar, beryl (including aquamarine and morganite), mica and radioactive minerals are found with pegmatites in the Proterozoic rocks in Zambezia Province and Nampula Province. Elsewhere, in the northeast, pegmatite hosts lithium, bismuth, quartz, beryl, columbium, antimony and tantalum.

The Eocene Cheringoma Formation and the Miocene Jofane Formation contain limestone, halite and gypsum. Mozambique is also notable for beach sands between Quelimane and Angoche, laden with zircon, rutile, monazite and ilmenite. The country has 120 to 380 million tons of coal reserves in the bottom units of the Karoo Supergroup in the Rio Lunho Basin. The Cretaceous Grudja Formation in shows the most promise for potential hydrocarbons and Mesozoic sedimentary sequences in the north and south both have the possibility of future discoveries.
