= Geology of Tanzania =

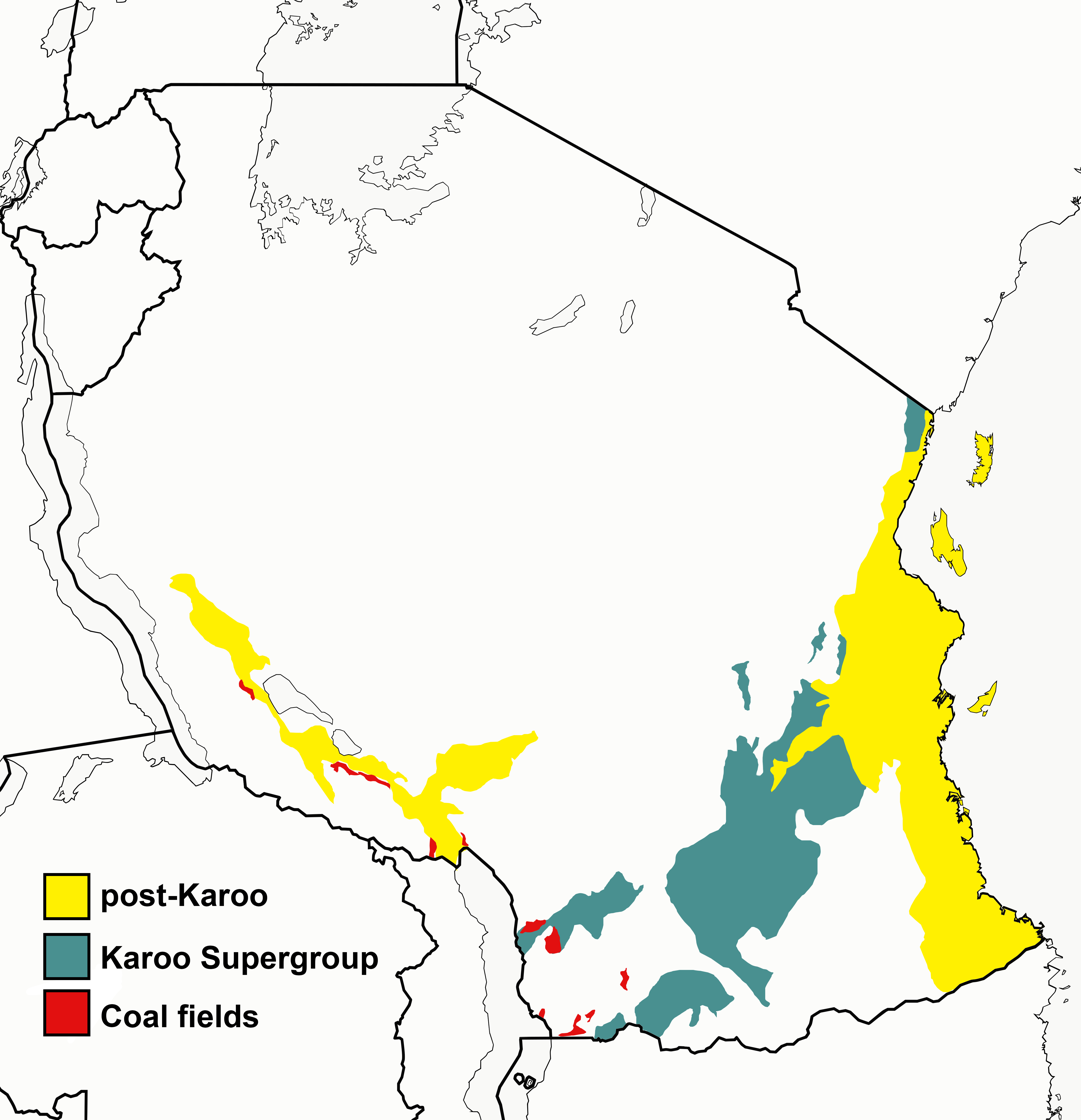
Simplified geologic map of Tanzania showing the Karoo Supergroup in green, post-Karoo rocks in yellow and coal in red

The geology of Tanzania began to form in the Precambrian, in the Archean and Proterozoic eons, in some cases more than 2.5 billion years ago. Igneous and metamorphic crystalline basement rock forms the Archean Tanzania Craton, which is surrounded by the Proterozoic Ubendian belt, Mozambique Belt and Karagwe-Ankole Belt. The region experienced downwarping of the crust during the Paleozoic and Mesozoic, as the massive Karoo Supergroup deposited. Within the past 100 million years, Tanzania has experienced marine sedimentary rock deposition along the coast and rift formation inland, which has produced large rift lakes. Tanzania has extensive, but poorly explored and exploited natural resources, including coal, gold, diamonds, graphite and clays.

== Stratigraphy and geologic history ==
The oldest Precambrian rocks in Tanzania form the stable continental crust of the Tanzania Craton and date to the Archean more than 2.5 billion years ago. The craton includes the vestiges of two Archean orogenic belts, the Dodoman Belt in central Tanzania, and the Nyanzian-Kavirondian in the north. The remains of these two belts produce lenses of sedimentary and volcanic rocks within granites and migmatite. The Dodoman Belt stretches for 480 kilometers, broadening westward and is composed of banded quartzites, aplite, sericitic schist, pegmatite and ironstone.

The Nyanzian Belt, by contrast, is mainly acid and basic basalt, dolerite, trachyte, rhyolite and tuff in separated zones south and east of Lake Victoria. The Kavirondian System is closely related to the Nyanzian, but separated by an unconformity and a zone of intense deformation. The Kavirondian is believed to be the remains of a molasse that formed by the Nyanzian as evidenced by sedimentary rocks such as mudstone, conglomerate as well as volcanics and grit.

=== Proterozoic (2.5 billion-539 million years ago) ===
The Ubendian Belt is a highly metamorphosed and folded metamorphic zone with intrusive granites southwest of the Tanzania Craton, paralleling Lake Tanganyika and Lake Rukwa. It likely formed in the Paleoproterozoic. Most rocks in the belt are pelite or various types of volcanic rock. Gneiss, hornblende, biotite, garnet and kyanite are common in the belt.

Northwestern Tanzania has the Mesoproterozoic Karagwe-Ankole Belt, with argillite, moderately metamorphosed phyllite, quartzites and sericitic schists. For the most part, the belt is only moderately folded, although deformation increases near granite intrusions. The belt is associated with Bukoban Series conglomerates, bedded sandstones and basalt flows which extend from the Ugandan border and terminate at the Rukwa Rift.

The Mozambique Belt is a structurally and metamorphically complex terrane that abuts the edge of the Tanzania Craton and formed during the Neoproterozoic. The formation of the belt is related to the widespread Pan-African orogeny and most rocks are highly metamorphosed pyroxene-gneiss, charnockite, biotite, hornblende. It also contains smaller occurrences of graphitic schist, quartzites and crystalline limestone.

=== Paleozoic (539-251 million years ago) ===
During the Paleozoic, after the Pan-African orogeny and the formation of the supercontinent Gondwana the Mozambique Belt experienced millions of years of erosion. This erosive period continued as Gondwana joined with Euramerica to become the supercontinent Pangaea.

=== Mesozoic-Cenozoic (251 million years ago-present) ===
In the Mesozoic, a major rift valley spanning what is today southern Africa and southern South America began to fill with sediments, depositing the first rock units of the Karoo Supergroup—the most extensive stratigraphic unit in southern Africa. In the Tanzania region, situated in the interior of Pangaea, the Karoo Supergroup deposited between the Late Carboniferous and the Early Jurassic, with sequences of terrestrial sediments. These sediments formed diverse rock units including sandstones, conglomerates, tillite, shale, red and gray mudstones and periodically, limestone deposits. Many of the Tanzanian Karoo rocks from this period contain plant and animal fossils.

With the fragmentation of Pangaea, the modern coastal region of Tanzania experienced a long lasting marine transgression, which deposited limestone, marl, sandstone and shale throughout the Late Jurassic, Cretaceous and almost all of the past 66 million years of the Cenozoic, up until the last 2.5 million years of the Quaternary. In the interior, the beginning East Africa Rift created large rift troughs, which filled with terrestrial sediments. Carbonatite volcanoes began erupting in the Cretaceous, a process that continued into the Cenozoic.

Alkaline volcanic rocks, including olivine basalt, alkaline basalt, nephelinite, phonolite, trachyte and pyroclastic flows from the Neogene are common north of Lake Nyasa and Lake Natron.

== Tectonics and volcanism ==
The East African Rift system plays a key role in Tanzania's current day structural geology. Graben rift valleys often have volcanism associated with them. The Western Rift is filled with Lake Tanganyika and Lake Nyasa, while the section from Lake Natron to Lake Nyasa is part of the Eastern Rift (also known as the Gregory Rift). Lake Rukwa and the Selous Basin occupy small, subsidiary rift basins. Structural geologists infer that Lake Victoria is situated in a downwarp in the crust between the two major rifts.

Ol Doinyo Lengai is the world's only active volcano with carbonatite lava and last had a large-scale eruption in 1966.

== Hydrogeology ==
Unconsolidated, near surface alluvial aquifers, recharged from rainwater are common in coastal deltas and river valleys, with an average depth of 10 to 20 meters, with some as much as 200 meters deep. The Sanya Plain and Kahe Basin around Mount Kilimanjaro have a mix of pyroclastic flow debris and alluvial sediments, creating some of the best aquifer potential.

The Coastal Sedimentary Aquifer is typically five to 30 meters thick, with a water depth of 10 to 35 meters below ground. Water quality varies, with periodic nitrate and salinity issues and better productivity from limestone and sandstone, compared with shale and marl. The Karoo Sandstone Aquifer is unconfined with intergranular flow and is also comparatively near surface—boreholes are seldom drilled more than 80 meters deep.

Although often exhibiting low-permeability, the crystalline basement rock that underlies much of the country does host groundwater in fractures and weathered layers. The Pangani Basin has high yield bands of gneiss and metasediments, along with weathered zones and bedrock fractures in the Makutopuri Basin. Basement aquifers are typically 50 meters thick.

== Natural resource geology ==
Tanzania has extensive natural resources, although many remain poorly explored and underdeveloped. The country has 300 kimberlite locations, centered within 200 kilometers of Shinyanga, in the north. Of these, about 20% contain diamonds. Approximately 70 tons of gold have been produced Archean rocks, near Geita on Lake Victoria as well as Proterozoic rocks in the Mpanda and Lupa districts.

Tanzania has some of the largest coal deposits in East Africa. A coal mine at Kiwira, close to Lake Nyasa produces 35,000 tons of coal per year. The Mongoro region has limestone, dolomite and white marble deposits. Rift valley lakes and coastal areas host poorly exploited evaporites. Tanzania has significant clay resources, including kaolin and bentonite. The Pugu Hill kaolin deposit is only partially exploited. International companies have been attracted to Tanzania by large graphite reserves, formed in kyanite gneiss and altered ore deposits. The altered ore type contains coarse flakes of graphite, often associated with tsavorite and tanzanite.

A phosphate mine, in the north, near Minjingu stopped production in the 1990s before rehabilitation got underway in the mid-2000s. Because of its high growth economy, cement for building construction is an important natural resource. Tanga Cement has a 40 percent market share, producing 500,000 tons of cement a year from Jurassic limestones.

=== Oil and natural gas ===
A large natural gas deposit was discovered at Songo Songo Island, 300 kilometers southeast of Dar es Salaam. However, other offshore and onshore exploration did not yield any results.
