= Geology of Uganda =

The geology of Uganda extends back to the Archean and Proterozoic eons of the Precambrian, and much of the country is underlain by gneiss, argillite and other metamorphic rocks that are sometimes over 2.5 billion years old. Sedimentary rocks and new igneous and metamorphic units formed throughout the Proterozoic and the region was partially affected by the Pan-African orogeny and Snowball Earth events. Through the Mesozoic and Cenozoic, ancient basement rock has weathered into water-bearing saprolite and the region has experienced periods of volcanism and rift valley formation. The East Africa Rift gives rise to thick, more geologically recent sediment sequences and the country's numerous lakes. Uganda has extensive natural resources, particularly gold.

== Stratigraphy and geologic history ==
=== Archean eon (4 billion - 2.5 billion years ago) ===
The oldest rocks in Uganda date to the Archean and are more than 2.5 billion years old, forming a gneiss and granulite complex in the north and center of the country.

==== Mesoarchean (3.2 - 2.8 billion years ago) ====
The oldest rocks in Uganda are the Mesoarchean gneisses and granulites of the Uleppi Group (or ‘Complex’) together with the associated Goli charnockitic gneiss, both reckoned to have been formed around 3,080 million years ago, in the extreme northwest of the country between Nebbi and Koboko. The slightly younger Karuma Complex dated to 2,990 million years ago is found in a tract of country extending north-east from the eastern shores of Lake Albert to the Victoria Nile.

The Watian Group rocks in the West Nile region date to the Mesoarchean, 2.9 billion years ago and metamorphosed to granulite grade on the sequence of metamorphic facies. Other rocks, similar to the Watian Group form enclaves within gneiss sequences in the Karamoja District.

These Archean rock formations tend to also include quartz diorite, acid and intermediate granulites and less commonly, basic granulites. Aruan Group rocks overly the Watian Group in the West Nile area, with biotite gneiss, hornblende gneiss, migmatite and granitic gneiss and quartzites. Karamoja Gneiss Group rocks share a very similar lithology to the Aruan Group, along with the eastern West Nile Mirian Group, although this group has experienced intense isoclinal folding.

==== Neoarchean (2.8 - 2.5 billion years ago) ====
The Neoarchean is represented by rhyolites, porphyry, tuff and basalt in the Nyanzian System, close to the Kenya border and in southeast Uganda. Most are between 2650 - 2590 million years old.

=== Proterozoic eon ===
==== Paleoproterozoic (2.5 billion – 1.6 billion years ago) ====
The Ruwenzori Fold Belt (also known as the Buganda-Toro System) dates to the Paleoproterozoic and covers much of western and south-central Uganda. The fold belt is mainly argillite, with thick amphibolite in the Jinja area and basal arenite in some locations. Parts of the belt are granitized, with low-grade phyllite close to Lake Victoria. Overall, the metamorphic grade tends to decrease southwards. The Ruwenzori Fold Belt includes the Igara Schist gneiss, quartzite and mica schist, as well as the sandstones, slate and phyllite of the Bwamba Pass Series and the Kilembe Series.

The Buganda Group of rocks comprising orthoquartzites, conglomerates, metavolcanics, slates, phyllites, mica schists and metasandstones is found around the shores of Lake Victoria from Jinja westwards and across as far as the largely faulted eastern edge of the Western Rift.

==== Mesoproterozoic (1.6 billion - 1 billion years ago) ====
The Kibaran orogeny impacted the region in the Mesoproterozoic, forming the arenites, argillites, siltstones and metacalcareous rocks of Karagwe-Ankole Belt, which unconformably overlies the Buganda-Toro System in the southwest. The Madi Series in northwest Uganda may date to a similar time period, but its age remains poorly understood.

A mix of quartzites, slates, shales, conglomerates and shales constitute the Muyage and Ruvubu groups grouped as the Kagera-Buhweju Supergoup in the region between Rakai and Mbarara, north of Busheyri and near Kamwenge. An arcuate suite of dykes were emplaced around 1,370 million years ago within the largely Neoarchaean and Palaeoproterozoic rocks from Kampala westwards. The Mityana Group of sandstones and conglomerates occur around Lake Wamala and nearby Mityana as well as forming the larger part of the Ssese Islands in Lake Victoria.

==== Neoproterozoic (1 billion - 539 million years ago) ====
The Neoproterozoic Bunyoro Series a 160-kilometer section of central Uganda, built on a bottom unit of tillite, likely related to the Snowball Earth glacial deposits from the period. The unmetamorphosed, molasse related Singo Series and Mityana Series of the Bukoban System are common in the west-central parts of the country. Karasuk Group rocks including gneiss, amphibolite, marble, quartzite and ultramafic rocks form a 200- by 40-kilometer strip near the Kenyan border, related to the Neoproterozoic Pan-African orogeny.

Neoproterozoic metamorphic rocks dominate the north-east of Uganda. The gneisses, granulite, marble, amphibolite and quartzite of the Karasuk Supergoup underlie the border region north of Nakapiripirit, extending east into Kenya. Multiple thrust faults exist within this unit. West of Nakapiripirit is a major klippe of the gneisses and granulites of the West Karamoja Group forming the Ukutat Massif. Its entire outcrop is thrust-bound except where overlain by Cenozoic volcanics. Similar rocks occupy the country northeast of a line through Pader and Kitgum to form the Akur Massif whilst a third klippe forms the Morungole Massif to the northeast. These klippen are intruded by a suite of granites, charnockites and similar rocks dating from around 680 to 740 million years ago.

=== Phanerozoic eon ===
==== Paleozoic ====
During the Paleozoic, between 539 and 251 million years ago, the supercontinent Gondwana, including Uganda, joined with Euramerica to form the new supercontinent Pangaea. A large rift valley formed in southern Pangaea spanning southern Africa and southern South America and filled with sediments, depositing the Karoo Supergroup, the most extensive stratigraphic unit in Africa. Compared with neighboring countries, Uganda has comparatively few Karoo rocks. Down-faulted outliers are situated beneath Entebbe, Dagusi Island and Bugiri. Deposition of the Karoo continued into the Mesozoic.

==== Mesozoic (251 million years ago – 66 million years ago) ====
There are some very limited outcrops of rocks dating from the Mesozoic, these being the mudstones and siltstones of the Ecca Formation and the tillites of the Kiruruma River Formation, collected together as the Karoo Supergroup. These isolated occurrences are to be found scattered to the north of Lake Victoria (Bugiri, Entebbe and Dagusi Island, ?Katonga River) and in the case of the KRF, just northwest of Kabale (Kiruruma River) in the extreme south-west of Uganda. Throughout the late Mesozoic into the Cenozoic, Uganda experienced the regional effects of the East Africa Rift, which caused deep layers of sediments—often laden with fossils—to accumulate as sedimentary rocks in rift valleys.

==== Cenozoic (66 million years ago – present) ====
Several volcanic centres in the east of the country were active during the Cenozoic. The carbonatites and nephelinites, lavas and agglomerates together with lahar deposits are collectively referred to as the Elgon Complex after Mount Elgon, the principal eruptive centre. Sediments of the Albertine Supergroup which include lavas, tuffs, silts, sands and gravels are found widely deposited within the Western (Albertine) Rift. The basalts and other deposits of the Bufumbira Formation occur in the southwestern extremity of the country. Nephelinites and basalts collected together as the Ngenge Formation are distributed in the Mount Elgon area and northwards. Superficial deposits of the last few million years include widespread development of laterites and deposition of alluvial sands and gravels by rivers.

In the Miocene, volcanic activity near the Kenyan border created the mountains in the Karamoja region. Carbonatite ring complexes formed due to the regionally unique geochemistry.

== Structural geology and tectonics ==
Structurally, the geology of Uganda is strongly influenced by fold belts and shear zones, as well as the East Africa Rift related crustal downwarping in the Pleistocene that formed Lake Victoria. The Aswa Shear Zone is one example of several Neoproterozoic shear zones in Precambrian rocks, running for 300 kilometers on a northwestern trend.

The country sits on two of the several fragments of African continental crust which have remained largely stable over this period of time; the Tanzania Craton in the south and the Bomu-Kibalian or Northeast Congo-Uganda Shield in the north. These two areas of Archaean age crust are wrapped around by mobile belts of Proterozoic age. More recently, as East Africa begins to split from the rest of the continent, the two arms of the East African Rift System have developed on either side of the country. The western arm of the rift system runs through western Uganda, where it is known as the Albertine Rift, whilst the eastern arm runs immediately east of its border with Kenya in the east. The two rifts define a tectonic block referred to as the Victoria Plate. Younger rocks are largely confined to the Cenozoic volcanic activity associated with the development of the two rift arms and sediments infilling the western rift.

The East Africa Rift defines the western border of Uganda with the Democratic Republic of the Congo. The rift is occupied by Lake Albert, Lake Edward and Lake George, along with the horst block of the Ruwenzori Mountains. Modern sediment depths in the Rift Valley are believed by 1.8 to 4 kilometers. Although volcanoes are no longer active in Uganda, the country has some remnant hot springs.

== Hydrogeology ==
Unconsolidated and unconfined fluvial aquifers, with an average water table depth of 20 meters are common along rivers in Uganda. However, most of the country is underlain by igneous and metamorphic crystalline basement rock from the Precambrian. Water in these semi-confined units occurs five to 20 meters below ground, either in weathered saprolite or fractures in the rock.

== Natural resource geology ==
Because of long-running, intense weathering, Uganda has deposits of gold, niobium, tantalum, tin, rare earth elements and apatite. Alluvial gold, tin and tungsten are mined in the Karagwe-Ankolean system. Gold has been mined from quartz vein and alluvial deposits near Busia, hosted in an Archean greenstone belt, and occurs in Paleoproterozoic and Mesoproterozoic metasediments at Buhweju and Kigezi. Exploration in the Buhweju-Mashonga area, indicates that artisanal gold mining is taking place in laterite gravels, overlying kaolin bedrock. The Cretaceous carbonatite ring complexes have provided vermiculite, titanium, vanadium, uranium, thorium and phosphate.
