= Hook granite massif =

Coordinates: 14°56′34″S 26°3′21″E

The Hook granite massif is a large formation in central Zambia formed around 550 million years ago during the Pan-African orogeny. It lies in the inner part of the Lufilian arc. Today, the south-western extension of the massif lies under the Kafue National Park.

== Formation ==
Field studies and U-Pb (uranium-lead) dating show that the massif is a large composite batholith that has intruded into the upper Katangan (Kundelungu) strata of sediments in the Lufilian arc during or after tectonic activity. Sample U-Pb dates for syntectonic granite in the massif are 559±18 and 566±5 Ma, and for post-tectonic granite 533±3 Ma. These show that the Kundelungu sediments date to before 570 Ma; the deformation of the inner Lufilian arc and voluminous syntectonic granite plutonism took place around 560–570 Ma; and the major tectonic activity had ended by around 530–540 Ma.

The Hook massif is bounded to the south by the Mwembeshi dislocation, a Pan-African transcurrent shear zone. Syntectonic rhyolite intruded in this shear zone dates to 551±19 Ma, so the transcurrent shearing happened about the same time as the batholith intrusion and was probably due to the same causes. Syntectonic and post-tectonic granite plutonism also took place around the same time in the Damara belt in Namibia, indicating a link with the Lufilian arc and Zambezi belt during the Pan-African orogeny.
