= Damara orogeny =

Mountain-building event at the intersection of the Congo and Kalahari cratons

The Damara orogeny was part of the Pan-African orogeny. The Damara orogeny occurred late in the creation of Gondwana, at the intersection of the Congo and the Kalahari cratons.

The Damara orogeny involved the suturing of the Congo–São Francisco and Río de la Plata cratons at 580–550 Ma (together with India forming northern Gondwana) before the amalgamation of the Kalahari and Mawson cratons in the Kuunga–Damara orogeny at 530 Ma (southern Gondwana).

The Adamastor Ocean closed southwards from the Araçuaı́ Belt (São Francisco Craton, now in South America) to the Kaoko Belt (Congo Craton, now in Africa) 580–550 Ma and 545–530 Ma Gariep Belt (Kalahari Craton, now in southern Africa). The Damara orogeny saw a peak in deformation and metamorphism at 530–500 Ma. Thrusting occurred onto the Kalahari Craton until 480 Ma.

Río de la Plata docked to Congo before the closure of the Damara Belt oceans (Mozambique and Khomas) which made the Damara orogeny part of the Kuunga orogeny which stretched from Antarctica to India across Africa. All African cratons had been assembled by c. 550 Ma and the last stages of the Damara–Kuunga Orogeny (the final amalgamation of north and South Gondwana) were intra-cratonic.

The Damara orogeny created the Naukluft Mountains in central Namibia between 550 Ma and 495 Ma.

== See also ==
- Mwembeshi Shear Zone – Ductile shear zone across Zambia
