= Muva =

The Muva is a term coined by E.H. Ackermann (1950) for a folded supracrustal shallow water succession of quartzites and pelites in the Irumide Belt of Zambia. The "Muva" was first described by A. Gray (1930).

The sequence is interpreted as a 1.8 billion year old shallow marine to coastal sequence which includes dunal deposits (aeolian), beach sands, offshore sand deposits and deeper water pelitic sediments. The alternation of quartzite-pelite successions was interpreted to record transgressive and regressive phases of a coastline along the southern margin of the Bangweulu Block. The presence of these types of rocks is also seen in areas that have undergone marine transgression.

In the western coastline of the Indian peninsula the Jurassic strata show this character of undergoing a submergence owing to crustal disturbance on the surface of the ocean floor and lead to the presence of marl with limestone in shallow water areas. Such effects are widely observed along the western coastline of India in parts of Saurashtra (Gujarat) and the Salt Range of Rajasthan.
