= Irumide Belt =

Mesoproterozoic terrane on the southern margin of the Bangweulu Block in Zambia

The Irumide Belt is a Mesoproterozoic terrane of deformed basement and folded supracrustals, which occurs along the southern margin of an Archaean/Palaeoproterozoic unit called the Bangweulu Block in Zambia. Together with the Damara Belt, it separates the Congo and Kalahari cratons.

The Irumide Belt comprises deformed crystalline basement units dated at 2.7 Ga and between 2.05 and 1.93 Ga, unconformably and in places structurally overlain by a supracrustal sequence of shallow water quartzites and pelites, the Muva Supergroup, in which sparse volcanic tuffs have given ages of between 1.88 and 1.85 Ga. This complex is intruded by limited granitoids at ca. 1.66-1.55 Ga and an extensive suite of syn-orogenic plutonic rocks at between 1.05 and 1.00 Ga.
