= Kibaran orogeny =

Mountain building event in present-day Africa

The Kibaran orogeny is a term that has been used for a series of orogenic events, in what is now Africa, that began in the Mesoproterozoic, around 1400 Ma and continued until around 1000 Ma when the supercontinent Rodinia was assembled. The term "Kibaran" has often been used for any orogenic rocks formed during this very extended period. Recently, it has been proposed that the term should be used in a much narrower sense for an event around 1375 Ma and a region in the southeast of the Democratic Republic of the Congo (DRC).

These orogenic events are also known as the Grenville orogeny in North America and the Dalslandian orogeny in Western Europe.

== Broad sense ==
Regions that contain relics of Kibaran age include the Kibara Mountains of the eastern DRC and Namaqua-Natal belt in southern Africa. Rocks of this age have been found in the Hoggar Mountains, in northwest and southwest Nigeria and in Cameroon to the north of the Congo Craton. The orogeny in northwest Nigeria was a major tectonic and thermal event that apparently was floored by an older continental basin.

In southern Africa, orogenic segments associated with construction of Rodinia are found in a region over 3,000 kilometres (1,900 mi) long and 400 kilometres (250 mi) wide. They resulted from convergence of the Congo Craton to the north with the Kalahari, Bangweulu, Tanzania and West-Nilian cratons to the south. The segments include sedimentary basins deformed by contraction of the crust during the extended period of plate convergence between 1400 Ma and 1000 Ma. These are intruded by large batholiths dated to 1390–1350 Ma and 1100–1000 Ma, caused by subduction and continental collision. Other segments are Archaean to Paleoproterozoic provinces that were strongly reworked into thin-skinned fold and thrust belts during the collision of 1100–1000 Ma. Local names for the segments, from north to south, are the Karagwe-Ankolean, Burundian, Kibarides, Irumides, Choma-Kalomo, Ngamiland, Namaqua-Natal and Lurio belts.

== Narrower sense ==
In one model the Kibaran belt is a continuous orogenic belt 1,500 kilometres (930 mi) long running in a northeast direction from Katanga Province in the DRC to southwest Uganda. However, there are two distinct segments: a southern belt that includes the Kibara Mountains in Katanga, from which the orogeny gets its name, and a northeastern belt that includes the Kivu-Maniema region of the DRC and parts of Rwanda, Burundi, southwest Uganda and northwest Tanzania. The two are separated by Palaeoproterozoic Rusizian terranes and the NW-SE trending Ubende shear belt further to the south in Tanzania. Zircon Uranium-lead dating shows that the 350 kilometres (220 mi) long northeastern Karagwe-Ankolean segment dates to 1375 Ma. Apparently it is not orogenic but is an intracratonic large igneous province formed in the boundary between the Tanzania craton to the east and the Eburnean-aged mobile belt to the west. Minor magmatic events occurred later in this segment around 1205 Ma and 986 Ma.

Recently it has been proposed that the term "Kibaran" should be given a much more restricted meaning, referring only to a tectono-magmatic event around 1375 Ma in which the Karagwe-Ankolean belt was formed in a region extending from the north of Lake Tanganyika to the south of Uganda, and that the term "Kibaran belt" should be confined to the belt around the Kibara mountains in the southeast of the Democratic Republic of the Congo.
