= Geology of South Sudan =

Geologic map of South Sudan

The geology of South Sudan is founded on Precambrian igneous and metamorphic rocks, that cover 40 percent of the country's surface and underlie other rock units. The region was affected by the Pan-African orogeny in the Neoproterozoic and extensional tectonics in the Mesozoic that deposited very thick oil-bearing sedimentary sequences in rift basins. Younger basalts, sandstones and sediments formed in the last 66 million years of the Cenozoic. The discovery of oil in 1975 was a major factor in the Second Sudanese Civil War, leading up to independence in 2011. The country also has gold, copper, cobalt, zinc, iron, marble, limestone and dolomite.

== Stratigraphy and geologic history ==
The oldest rocks in South Sudan are Precambrian gneiss, metasediments and basic volcanics that form the igneous and metamorphic basement rock that underlies the country and is exposed as 40 percent of its surface. Some Precambrian rocks may be well over two billion years old. However, in most cases they were reactivated and altered in the Neoproterozoic Pan-African orogeny.

Northwest South Sudan has the Mesozoic Cretaceous Nubian sandstone overlying basement rock. Much of northern South Sudan is underlain by deep, oil-bearing rift basins, with sedimentary rocks up 13.7 kilometers thick. Lacustrine shales, claystones, sandstones and conglomerates formed in the Jurassic and Cretaceous. Alluvial sediments formed in the past 2.5 million years of the Quaternary flank major rivers in the north, center and east. The Cenozoic Um Ruwaba Formation covers most of central and eastern South Sudan and basalt, also from the Cenozoic occurs close to the border with Ethiopia.

== Hydrogeology ==
Most of southwest South Sudan is underlain by low productivity Precambrian basement rock. Sedimentary aquifers with intergranular flow are found in the northwest, abutting a large area spanning most of the north and center of the country with unconsolidated alluvial sediments. Modest areas of fractured volcanic with a range of water productivity are found near the Ethiopian border.

== Natural resource geology ==
Alluvial gold is relatively common in South Sudan and is often extracted through artisanal mining. Copper and gold ore, associated with radioactive minerals, occurs at Hofrat Ennahas in Western Bahr El Ghazal state, and has been explored by major companies such as Billington.

Bauxite layers between four and 20 meters thick formed in laterite east of Juba, west of Wau and west of Yambio. Often, a 10 to 30 meter thick section of iron ore overlies bauxite, particularly west of Wau and close to the border of Central African Republic and Sudan. South Sudan also has zinc, manganese, lead, nickel and cobalt. The country has marble, limestone and dolomite but no active cement plants. The Kapoeta marble is proposed as a source for cement, to overcome the very high $640 US dollar per ton of imported cement.

Prior to South Sudanese independence in 2011, Chevron Overseas Petroleum launched a major survey of unstudied rift basins in the interior of Sudan in 1975. The survey revealed up to 300 billion barrels of oil housed in extremely thick sediment sequences in Heglig and Unity State. The development of the oil industry was a major factor in the Second Sudanese Civil War.
