= Whiteschist =

Type of metamorphic rock

A whiteschist is an uncommon metamorphic rock formed at high to ultra-high pressures. It has the characteristic mineral assemblage of kyanite + talc, responsible for its white colour. The name was introduced in 1973 by German mineralogist and petrologist Werner Schreyer. This rock is associated with the metamorphism of some pelites, evaporite sequences or altered basaltic or felsic intrusions. Whiteschists form in the MgO–Fe_{2}O_{3}–Al_{2}O_{3}–SiO_{2}–H_{2}O (MFASH) system. Rocks of this primary chemistry are extremely uncommon and they are in most cases thought to be the result of metasomatic alteration, with the removal of various mobile elements.

== Occurrence ==
Whiteschists occur as lenses or tectonic slices on a metre to kilometre scale within nine orogenic belts around the world. There are two occurrences in Central Africa, one in Tasmania, one in the Norwegian Caledonides, two in the Alps and three in Asia. One of the most extensive outcrops of whiteschist occurs within the Lufilian Arc - Zambezi Belt orogen. This northwest-southeast trending zone extends for about 700 km. The whiteschist is found with rocks bearing the assemblages anthophyllite–cordierite–kyanite and garnet–staurolite–kyanite. Most occurrences were originally described from metasedimentary sequences, and thought to represent either evaporite or bentonite layers. However, whiteschists have now been described with protoliths ranging from metabasalt to granite.

== Formation ==
Whiteschists have a chemistry that only very rarely occurs as the primary composition of rocks. This implies that they can only form under conditions where other chemical components have been removed by large scale metasomatism, strongly altering the original rock composition. The mobile components that may be removed include Na_{2}O, CaO, K_{2}O, MnO, P_{2}O_{5}, Rb, Ba, Th. Another feature of whiteschists is that iron and manganese only occur in their highest oxidation state, indicating that the fluid responsible for the metasomatism was characterised by a high oxygen fugacity. The main reaction involved in their formation is Mg-chlorite + quartz → talc + kyanite, which has been used to define the stability of the whiteschist assemblage. In at least one example however, the overall reaction phlogopite + amphibole + plagioclase → kyanite + talc + quartz + Fe(hematite) + Na, Ca, K, Mn (fluid) has been described from an altered amphibolite, suggesting that the original reaction may be insufficient to describe the full stability range of the kyanite + talc assemblage under high oxygen fugacity conditions.
