= Lufilian Arc =

Coordinates: 11.666667°S 27.466667°E

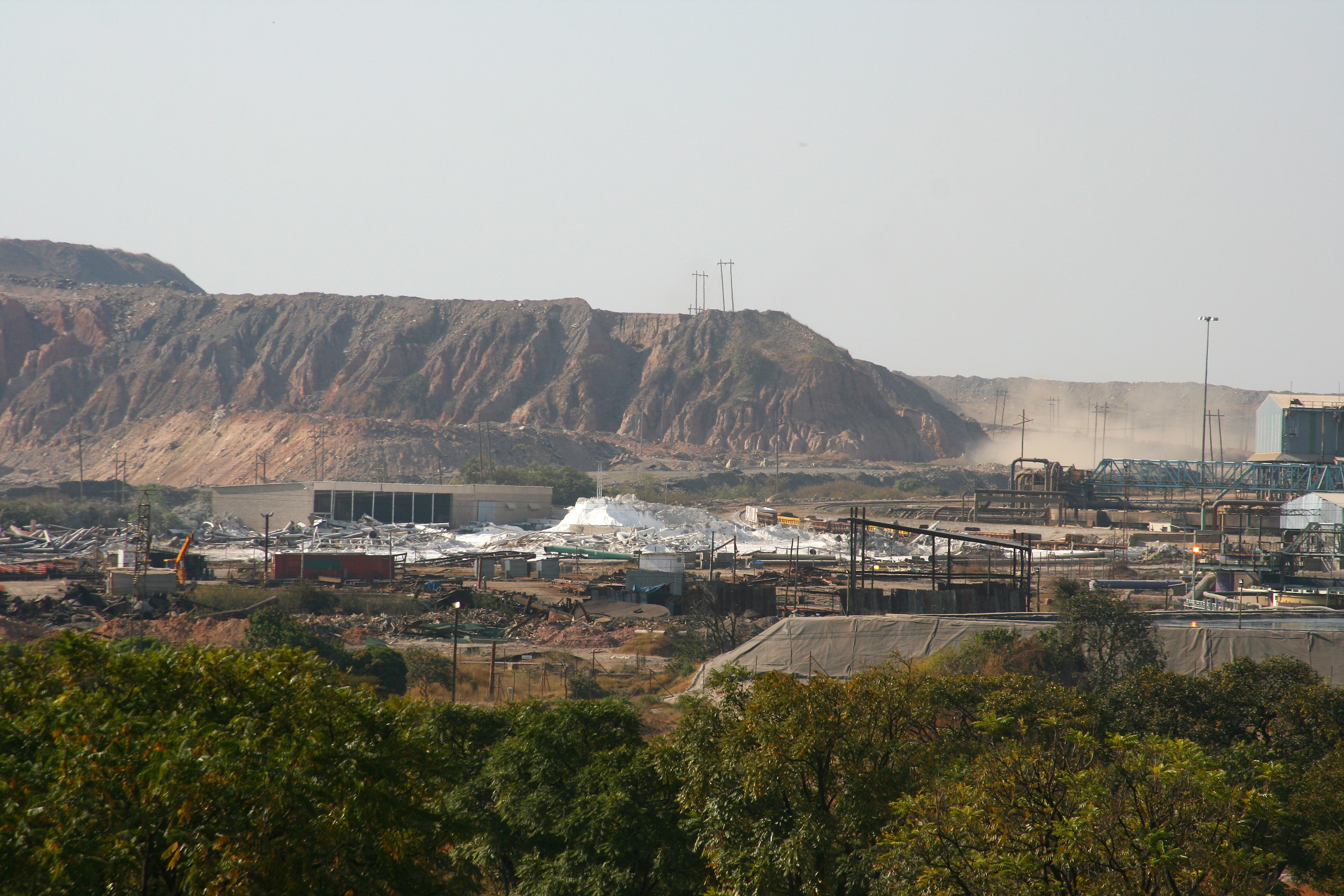
Nchanga copper mine near Chingola, Zambia (2008)

The Lufilian Arc (or Lufilian Belt) is part of a system of orogenic belts in southern Africa formed during the Pan-African orogeny, a stage in the formation of the Gondwana supercontinent. It extends across eastern Angola, the Katanga Province of the southern Democratic Republic of the Congo and the northwest of Zambia. The arc is about 800 kilometres (500 mi) long. It has global economic importance owing to its rich deposits of copper and cobalt.

== Evolution ==
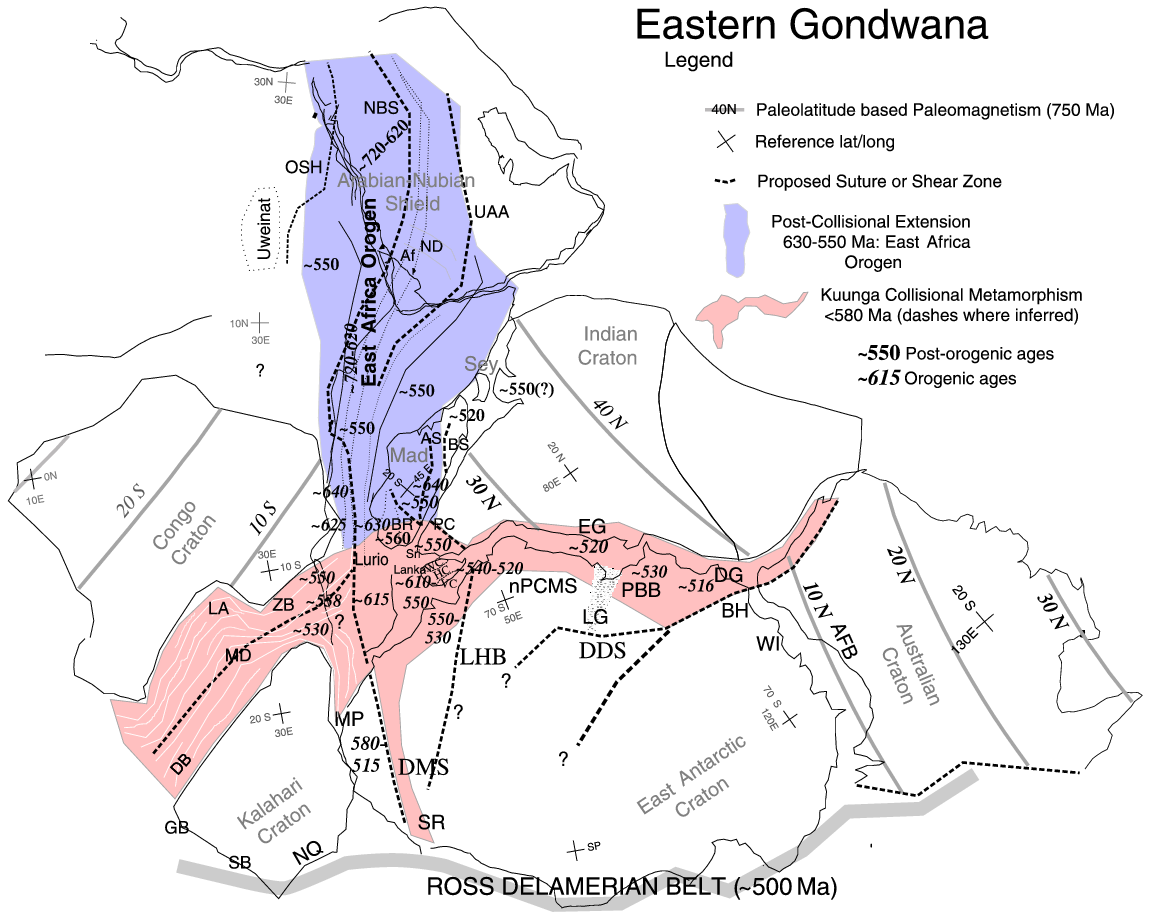
Eastern Gondwana, with southern Africa to the left. The Lufilian Arc is marked "LA", in the pink shaded region between the Congo and Kalahari cratons in the lower left of the map. It is bounded to the southeast by the Mwembeshi Dislocation, marked "MD" (click to enlarge).

The Katanga Supergroup of Neoproterozoic sediments rests on a basement formed in the Paleoproterozoic or Mesoproterozoic eras. The lower basement is made of granites, gneisses and schists formed during the Eburnean age, about 2100–2000 Ma. (Note: Ma: million years ago) The upper basement extends under part of the arc in Zambia and is mostly made of schists, quartzites and quartz-muscovite schists. The Kibaran orogeny deformed and metamorphosed the upper basement between 1350 Ma and 1100 Ma.

The Katanga supergroup sediments are from 5 kilometres (3.1 mi) to 10 kilometres (6.2 mi) thick. Rifting between the Congo and Kalahari cratons around 880 Ma opened two basins, first the Roan rift and then the Nguba rift, both of which gathered sediments. Extension was replaced by compression as the Kalahari and Congo cratons moved back towards each other at the start of the Pan-African orogeny. Nappes advancing from the south deposited olistostrome detritus into the Fungurume foreland basin to the north of the arc. Nappe overthrusting and deformation of the foreland followed before the olistostrome sediments had lithified.

Scheme of an Anticline: A fold that is convex up and has its oldest beds at its core. Erosion may expose the older rocks.

The crust was shortened by up to 150 kilometres (93 mi) between 590 and 512 Ma in the Pan-African orogeny. Compression deformed the Katanga supergroup sedimentary rocks into a fold and thrust belt, the Lufilian Arc. Tectonic inversion raised up deposits from the deepest levels. The orogeny lifted and folded Roan strata holding copper and cobalt deposits, which later became exposed through erosion. In several areas they are now accessible through open pit mines, as in the Kambove mines in Katanga.

The Mwembeshi Shear Zone forms the southern boundary of the Lufilian Arc, separating it from the Zambezi belt. The shear zone also dates to the Pan-African orogeny. It allowed a change in the structural vergence, or direction of folding, between the Zambezi Belt and the Lufilian Arc. The Hook granite massif, in the inner arc just north of the Mwembeshi Shear Zone, is a large composite batholith (emplacement of igneous rock) that has intruded into the arc's Kundelungu strata of sediments during or after tectonic activity. Uranium-lead dating of samples of syntectonic granite in the massif gives ages of 559±18 and 566±5 Ma, with 533±3 Ma for post-tectonic granite, showing that the intrusion developed around the same time as the shear zone, presumably from the same causes.

== Sediments ==
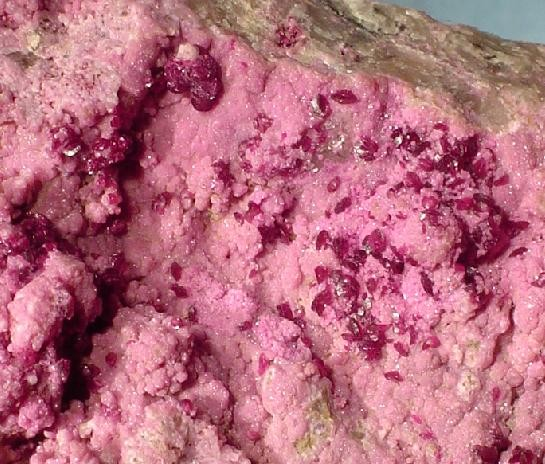
Ruby Spherocobaltite crystals in a vug lined with microcrystals of pink, cobaltoan dolomite from Kakanda Mine at Kambove in Katanga

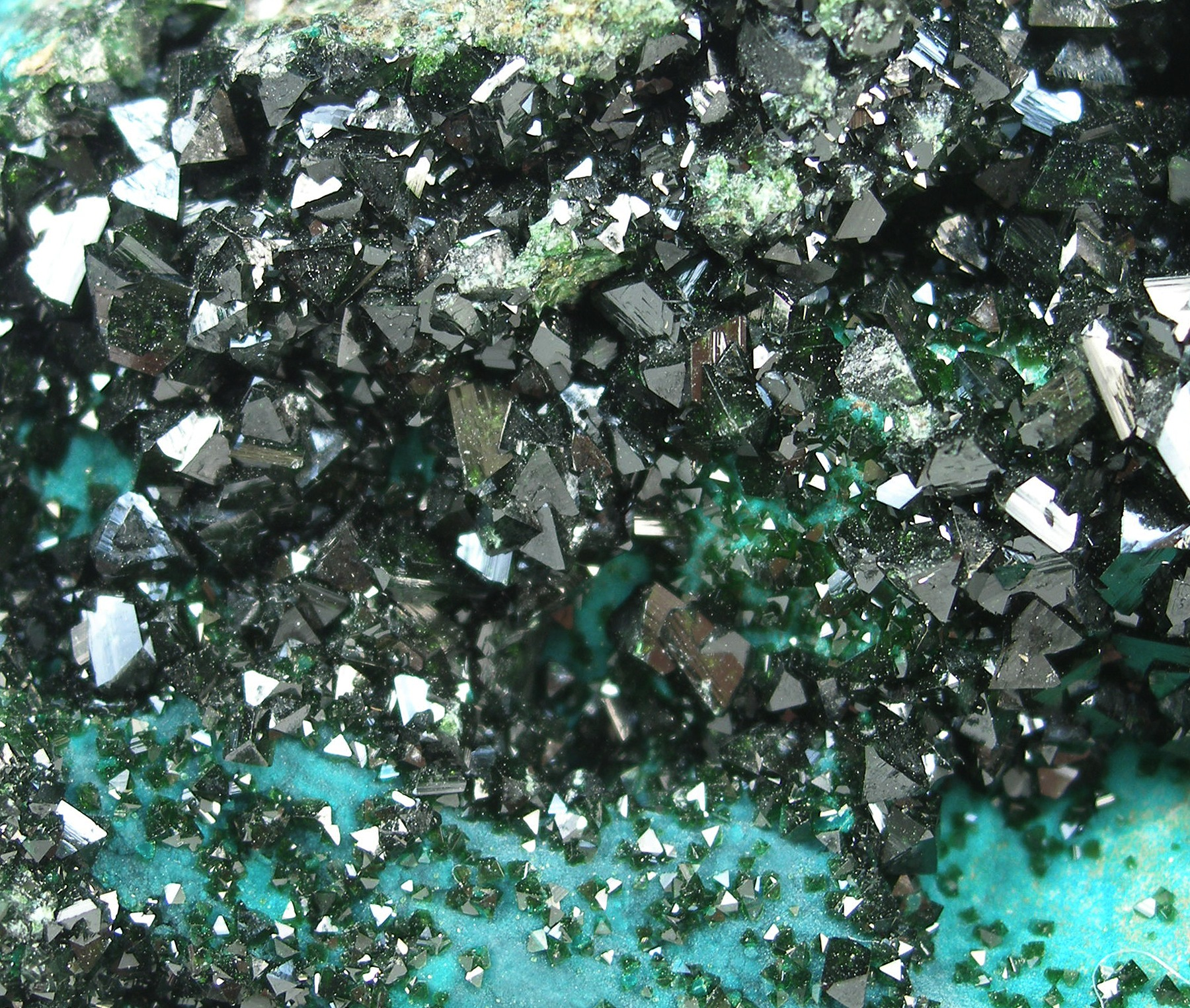
Libethenite from Kambove

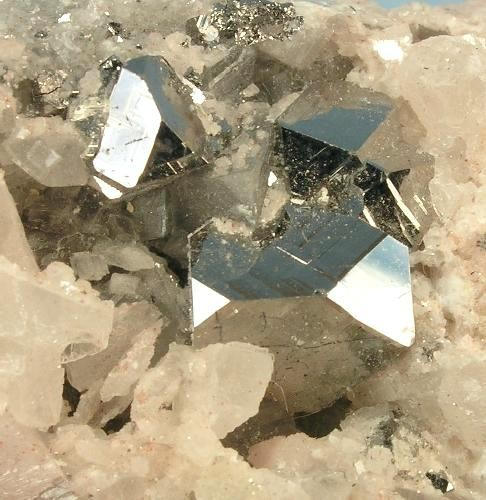
Carrollite crystals embedded in calcite from Kamoya South II Mine

The oldest group of sediments in the Katanga supergroup is the Roan, which started to be deposited in a continental rift basin formed after about 880 Ma as the Congo craton pulled away from the Kalahari craton. Above this the Nguba group until recently has been defined as strata that begin with a diamictite layer, probably created by Sturtian glacial action. It is capped with another diamictite layer that may have been laid down during the Marinoan glaciation (650 to 635 Ma). (Note: Sturtian glacial deposits are widespread in different continents, laid down during the period from about 746 Ma to 663 Ma. Marinoan glacial deposits have also been found around the world, indicating an extreme ice age that probably lasted less than 10 Ma and ended around 635 Ma.) Many geologists place the most recent strata of the Katanga supergroup within the Kundelungu group. The groups and subgroups of sedimentary rocks are shown in the table below, from youngest to oldest.

Supergroup	Group	Subgroup	Oldest age	Lithologies
Katanga	Kundelungu	Plateaux		Shales and arkoses
Katanga	Kundelungu	Kiubo		Dolomitic shales, sandy shales and sandstones
Katanga	Kundelungu	Kalule		Dolomitic shales or sandy shales, pink limestones, diamictite
Katanga	Nguba	Monwezi		Dolomitic shales or siltstones
Katanga	Nguba	Likasi		Dolomitic or sandy shales, dolomites or limestone, diamictite
Katanga	Roan	Mwashya	760 Ma	Dolomitic shales, dolomites, jaspers and pyroclastics
Katanga	Roan	Dipeta		Interbedded dolomites, argillaceous and dolomitic siltstones
Katanga	Roan	Mines		Dolomites, dolomitic shales and sandstones
Katanga	Roan	R.A.T.	880 Ma	Argillaceous dolomitic siltstones, sandstone and pelites

A revised stratigraphy from 2011 is shown in the table below. Apart from some refinement or merging of subgroups, a significant revision is to reallocate the Mwashya sediments from the Roan basin to the Nguba basin. There was prominent uplifting no later than 765 Ma in the south of the Roan rift basin that ended the deposit of platform carbonates and caused the Nguba rift to open and to expand northward beyond the former Roan rift margin. The Mwashya sediments post-date this event. Another significant change is recognition of the distinctive deposits in the Fungarume foreland basin to the north of the arc, which overlap in age with the Plateau group and include material from earlier groups carried from the south by Katangan thrust sheets. These deposits range from deep marine olistostromes to shallow marine clastic and carbonate deposits as the Fungurume basin was filled.

Supergroup	Group	Subgroup	Oldest age	Lithologies
Katanga	Plateau			Continental molasse arkoses and shales
Katanga	Fungurume		≤573 Ma	3. Marginal marine carbonates 2. Marginal marine siliciclastics and continental red beds 1. Olistostromes
Katanga	Kundelungu	Kiubo		Marine siliciclastics and carbonates
Katanga	Kundelungu	Kalule		Marine siliciclastics and carbonates, cap carbonates, glacial deposits
Katanga	Nguba	Monwezi		Marine siliciclastics and carbonates
Katanga	Nguba	Likasi	735 Ma	Cap carbonates, glacial deposits, last rift volcanoes
Katanga	Nguba	Mwashya	765 Ma	3. Black shales and volcanics 2. Marine siliciclastics and carbonates 1. Olistostromes
Katanga	Roan	Bancroft		Platform carbonates
Katanga	Roan	Kitwe		Siliciclastics and carbonates
Katanga	Roan	Mindola	880 Ma	Siliciclastics, copper mineralization

== Economic importance ==
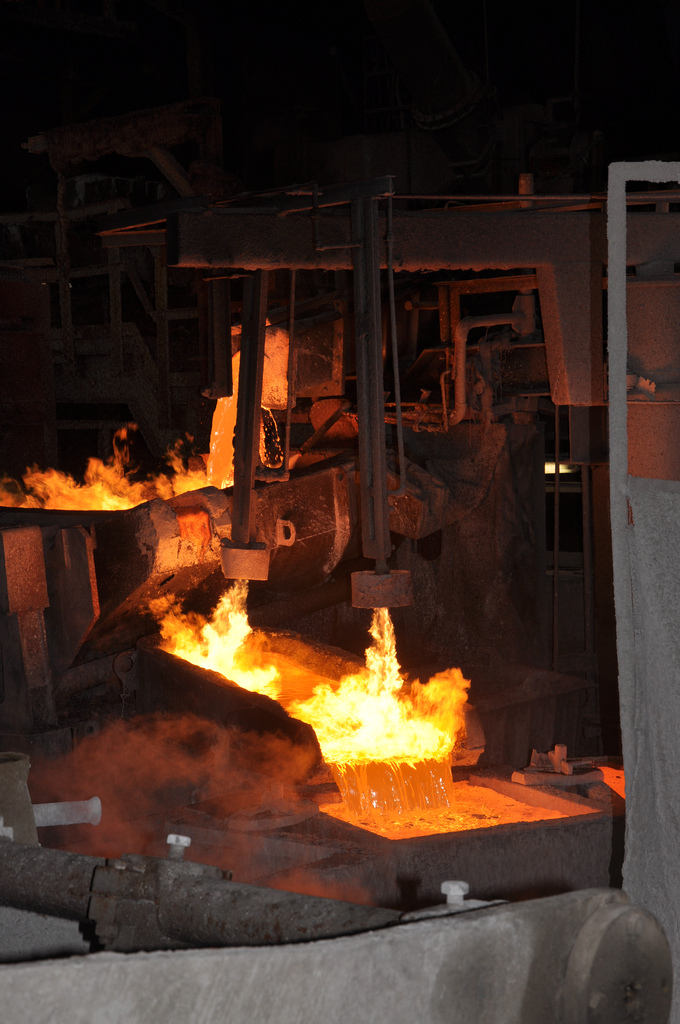
Molten copper being poured at Mopani Copper Mine's Mufulira Mine in Zambia, once the largest in Africa

The Lufilian Arc contains the 520 kilometres (320 mi) African copperbelt, which runs in a northwesterly direction from Zambia into the Katanga Province in the Democratic Republic of the Congo (DRC). The copper deposits are found in the older rocks of the Roan group. In the DRC they are mostly held in dolomitic hosts, with high levels of cobalt. In Zambia they are in low-carbonate shale, sandstone and graywacke.

Historically the African copperbelt ores have been more accessible and higher grade than ores from other locations. In 1932 copper percentages in Zambian ore reserves were 3.44% (Roan Antelope), 4.3% (Rhokana) and 4.14% (Mufulira, Chambishi and Baluba). This compares to 1.41% on average for copper ore reserves in the United States at that time. Additional advantages are that the mines mostly contain sulphide ores, which are comparatively easy to concentrate and smelt, and that labor costs are low. As of 2010 the African copperbelt provided about 25% of the world's copper and about 80% of its cobalt. It also has major zinc and lead deposits.
