= Zambezi Belt =

Area of mountain building now in southern Zambia and northern Zimbabwe

The Zambezi Belt is an area of orogenic deformation in southern Zambia and northern Zimbabwe. It is a segment of a broader belt lying between the Congo Craton and the Kalahari Craton, which also includes the Lufilian Arc and the Damaran Belt. The eastern margin of the belt interacts with the north-south Eastern African orogen.

The Zambezi belt shows evidence of two large tectonothermal events, one between about 890-880 Ma (Note: Ma = million years ago) and the other about 550-520 Ma. Both events reworked existing Archean to Mesoproterozoic components, with small additions of younger material. The second event was caused by the collision of the Congo and Kalahari cratons during the assembly of the Gondwana supercontinent at the end of the Neoproterozoic. The belt includes the Kadunguri Whiteschists, which were formed by metasomatic alteration at high pressures of ocean-island-type metabasalts during the Pan-African orogeny.

The Mwembeshi Shear Zone forms the northern boundary of the Zambezi Belt, separating it from the Lufilian Arc. The shear zone also dates to the Pan-African orogeny. It allowed a change in the structural vergence, or direction of folding, between the Zambezi Belt and the Lufilian Arc.
