= Limpopo Belt =

Geological boundary between the Zimbabwe and Kaapvaal cratons

Southern Africa showing location of Limpopo belt

The Limpopo Belt is a geological boundary located in South Africa and Zimbabwe, runs E-NE, and joins the Kaapvaal craton to the south with the Zimbabwe Craton to the north. The belt is of high-grade metamorphic rocks that have undergone a long cycle of metamorphism and deformation that ended 2.0 billion years ago, after the stabilisation of the adjacent massifs. The belt comprises 3 components: the Central Zone, the North Marginal Zone and the South Marginal Zone.

== Ca. 3.2-2.9 Ga Limpopo Central Zone ==
The 250 km wide Limpopo belt of southern Africa is an east-northeast trending zone of granulite facies tectonites separating the granitoid-greenstone terranes of the Kaapvaal and Zimbabwe cratons. Large scale ductile shear zones are an integral part of Limpopo belt architecture. They define the boundaries between the belt and the adjacent cratons and separate internal zones within the belt. The shear zones forming the external (northern, southern and western) margins of the belt are interpreted as uplift structures of the overthickened crust.

The crustal evolution of the Limpopo Central Zone can be summarized into three main periods: 3.2-2.9 Ga, ~2.6 Ga, and ~2.0 Ga. The two first periods are mainly characterized by magmatic activity leading to the formation of Archaean Tonalite-Trondhjemite-Granodiorite (TTG) such as the Sand River Gneisses or the Bulai Granite intrusion. The Early Proterozoic event took place under high-grade metamorphic conditions during which partial melting formed large amount of granitic melt.

The Limpopo Central Zone shows relics of late Archean high grade metamorphism. In the Northern (NMZ) and Southern Marginal Zones (SMZ) that adjoin the Zimbabwe and Kaapvaal cratons, respectively, the last high grade metamorphic episodes were late Archean. The relics in the Central Zone are characterised by an anticlockwise p-T-evolution, at ca. 2.55 Ga. In the NMZ repeated crustal remelting and intrusion of charnoenderbitic magmas continued to 2.58 Ga, producing counterclockwise p-T paths. In contrast the SMZ consists of medium to high pressure granulites, which underwent a clockwise p-T-evolution at ca. 2.69 Ga, followed by decompression and isobaric cooling. In the Northern Kaapvaal craton (Renosterkoppies Greenstone Belt, Pietersburg area) tectonism took place under amphibolite facies conditions at ca. 2.75 Ga and can therefore not be related to any events in the Limpopo belt. Thus the different tectonic units have different late Archean tectonometamorphic histories. Trace element geochemistry as well as Pb + Nd isotope characteristics of the SMZ are similar to those of the Kaapvaal craton, with low Th and U concentrations around 2 and 0.7 ppm. Low U concentrations in the SMZ are not a consequence of high grade metamorphism. The NMZ, with high Th, U concentrations (10.8 and 2.5 ppm) and radiogenic Pb, resembles the adjoining Zimbabwe craton more. The differences in late Archean tectonic styles between NMZ and SMZ+KC is a possible consequence of the differences in Th and U content of these provinces.

"The Mahalapye granite in the extreme western part of the Central Zone is a post-tectonic intrusion that crystallized at 2.023 Ga. This suggests that mineral ages of ca 2.0 Ga from the eastern part of the Central Zone date metamorphism during reworking of Archaean age shear zones rather than a collision between the Kaapvaal and Zimbabwe cratons as has been earlier suggested.

== See also ==
- Kalahari Craton
- Kaapvaal craton
- Zimbabwe Craton
