= Mporokoso Group =

Succession of sedimentary rocks in Zambia

- Stratigraphic range: Between 1.8 Ma and 1.1 Ma
- Type: Geological formation
- Unit of: Bangweulu Block

Location
- Country: Zambia

The Mporokoso Group is the name given to a sedimentary succession of fluvial, lacustrine and aeolian sandstones and minor siltstones occurring on the Bangweulu Block of northern Zambia.

The group ia between 1.8 Ma and 1.1 Ma in age, and consists of four stratigraphic units, the Lower Quartzite, the Lower Shale, the Upper Quartzite, and the Upper Shale. The group extends into Tanzania as the Kasanga Beds.

The group forms part of the regionally defined Muva Supergroup which occurs also in the Irumide Belt of Zambia.
