= Mozambique Belt =

Band in the Earth's crust from East Antarctica to the Arabian-Nubian Shield

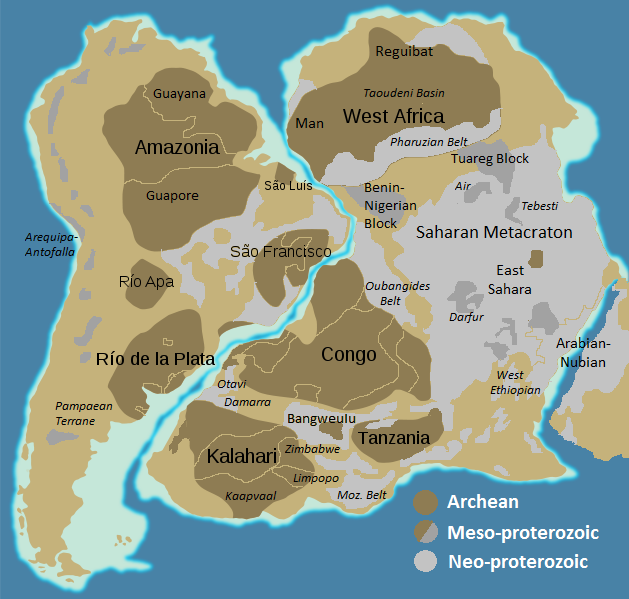
West Gondwana with major cratons in brown and Pan-African orogenies in grey

The Mozambique Belt is a band in the Earth's crust that extends from East Antarctica through East Africa to the Arabian-Nubian Shield. It formed as a suture between plates during the Pan-African orogeny, when Gondwana was formed.

The Mozambique Belt includes components created when the Mozambique Ocean opened and others created when the ocean later closed.

== Extent ==
The western portion of the Mozambique Belt is mostly composed of upper amphibolite-grade gneisses, reworked rocks from the Tanzania craton and Usagaran Belt, emplaced between 2,970 and 2,648 million years ago. The eastern portion has high-grade arc-derived rocks ranging in age from 841 to 632 million years ago.

Both terranes also include Neoproterozoic metasedimentary rocks.

The differences may indicate origins in two different basins, with the eastern basin rocks being thrust over those of the western basin during closure of the Mozambique Ocean between 585 and 550 million years ago.

== Formation ==
Many geologists consider that the Mozambique Ocean formed during the break-up of Rodinia between 800 and 700 million years ago, accompanied by volcanic activity. Magmatism from this period is found in East Africa and Madagascar, although not in the southern Mozambique Belt. The ocean probably separated the Kalahari craton from the combined Congo–Tanzania craton, and separated the Madagascar–India block from the Congo–Tanzania block. The ocean began closing between Madagascar–India and Congo–Tanzania between 700 and 580 million years ago, with closure between 600 and 500 million years ago.

Exposed rocks in Kenya and Tanzania include rift sediments and passive margin metasediments from the early Neoproterozoic continental margin. They also include older crustal material from the Tanzanian craton that has been reworked. At one time the belt was thought to have been caused by the collision of east and west Gondwana. According to a more recent theory, Gondwana formed over an extended period from accretion of independent terranes.

The Mozambique Belt rocks formed from magmatic underplating and a period of residence in the mid-lower crust followed by cooling between 640 and 620 million years ago. The rocks were exhumed over 500 million years ago. The deeper crustal levels were elevated by the closure of the Mozambique Ocean and the upper crustal arc remnants were removed by erosion.

== Sources ==
- Cutten, Huntly N.C. (October 29, 2002). "The Mozambique Belt, Eastern Africa – Tectonic Evolution of the Mozambique Ocean and Gondwana Amalgamation". The Geological Society of America.
- Cutten, H. N. C.; Johnson, S. P.; De Waele, B. (2006). "Tectonic Evolution of the Mozambique Belt, Eastern Africa" (PDF).
- Grantham, G.H.; Maboko, M.; Eglington, B.M. (2003). "A review of the evolution of the Mozambique Belt and implications for the amalgamation and dispersal of Rodinia and Gondwana". Proterozoic East Gondwana: supercontinent assembly and breakup. Geological Society. ISBN 1-86239-125-4.
