= Bangweulu Block =

Part of the Congo craton of central Africa

The Bangweulu Block is a cratonic unit that forms part of the Congo craton of central Africa. The Bangweulu Block however consists of Palaeoproterozoic granitoids and volcanics, and is overlain by a Palaeoproterozoic continental sedimentary succession, the Mporokoso Group, and does not preserve much direct evidence of Archaean protoliths.

Indirect evidence of an Archaean ancestry for the Bangweulu Block is provided by detrital zircons within the Mporokoso Group, which indicate a local source area with zircons of 3.2, 3.0. 2.7 and 2.5 Ga, but more importantly, by xenocrystic zircon found in volcanic and granitic lithologies of the Bangweulu Block, and the area to the West, the Central African Copperbelt (Rainaud et al., 2003). This indicates the presence of a ca. 3.2 Ga terrane called the Likasi Terrane.

The Bangweulu Block is bordered on the west by the Kundelungu Plateau, on the southwest by the Lufilian Arc, on the southeast by the Kibaran Irumide Belt, and on the northeast by the Ubendian Belt. The block was formed during the Eburnian orogeny, with the crystalline basement dated at 1,835 Ma, implying last Eburnian magmatism. Post-Eburnian sediments include the Mporokoso Group, the Kasama Formation, the Luitikila and Luapula Beds, and Cenozoic alluvium from the Chambeshi River and the Kalungu, Lower Chambeshi and Lake Bangweulu Basins.
