= Vergence (geology) =

Direction of the overturned component in an asymmetric fold

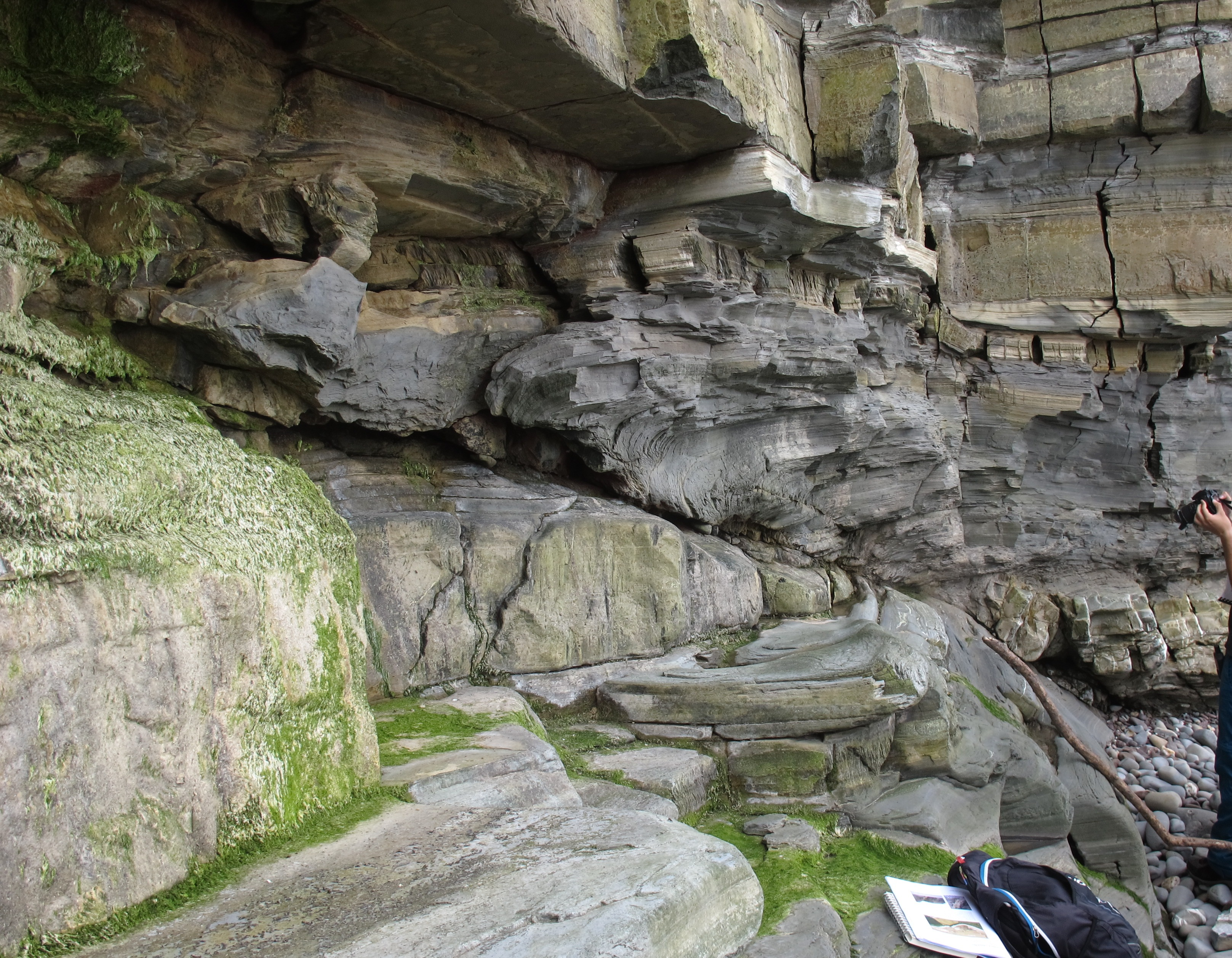
A thrust fault with southward dip and northward vergence

In structural geology, vergence refers to the direction of the overturned component of an asymmetric fold. In simpler terms, vergence can be described as the horizontal direction in which the upper component of rotation is directed. Vergence can be observed and recorded in folds to help a geologist determine characteristics of larger fold areas. Vergence is used to provide an overall characterization, in the symmetry (or asymmetry) of folds, and can be used to observe changes in small-scale structures in relation to the axis of a large fold. The vergence of a fold lies parallel to the surrounding surfaces of a fold, so if these surrounding surfaces are not horizontal, the vergence of the fold will be inclined. For a fold, the direction and the extent to which vergence occurs can be calculated from the strike and dip of the axial surfaces, along with that of the enveloping surfaces. These calculations can be handy for geologists in determining the overall elements of larger areas.

== Historical confusion on the definition of vergence ==
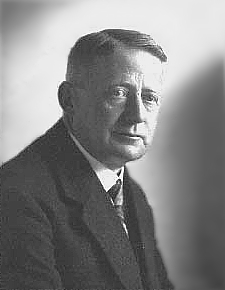
Hans Wilhelm Stille, 1941

Vergence is a term that has been commonly confused and, as a result, somewhat misunderstood throughout its history of use. The earliest form of use, and the recognized introduction to the term vergence, came from the German geologist, Hans Stille, in 1924. Stille originally used the term to describe the direction of the overturning of minor folds, as well as to describe the "up-dip" direction, which is directly related to the strike and dip of a fold. These descriptions of certain physical components of a fold, determined by vergence, were used by Stille in the description of the overall direction of the over-thrusting in a fold and, as a result, they are directly related to the kinematic components in a fold. In this sense, the term vergence, has implications of movement and, thus, has become controversial in geology, because vergence, in Stille's original definition, only describes geometrical relationships, and many geologists believed it should not be used as a primary tool for describing movement. As a result of this controversy, the use of the term never reached international agreement, and consequently has been used in distinctly different ways, throughout history.

Most of the confusion, about the definition of vergence, stems from the confusion and conflation of the concepts of fold-facing and fold-vergence. Some geologists began to reference the definition of vergence to being the direction in whose is a fold is facing, while others believed the definition to coincide with its original use by Stille, which was the direction of the up-dip direction of a fold on an axial surface. The disagreement likely derived, because Stille was not explicitly clear about the direction of the overturning of folds following the up-dip or down-dip of the fold. In his original use of the term, however, he did, in fact, use the up-dip direction of the fold. The main reason this creates confusion is a result of the common definition of fold-facing in geology, which is described as the direction (normal to the axis of a fold and corresponding to the axial plane) that points towards younger beds. As a result of this definition, two folds, which possess identical asymmetry, can be seen as facing opposite directions in relation to the stratigraphic elements of the structure, resulting in differently interpreted directions of vergence. To clear up this confusion, geologists have attempted to create a more definitive definition of vergence.

The now, more widely accepted definition of vergence, which is used to help describe the geometric component of asymmetry in a fold, is the horizontal direction in which the upper component of rotation in a fold is directed. In this definition, the concept of vergence is distinguished from and independent of the facing component of a fold. Based on this independence, much of the confusion has been cleared up, and both concepts of vergence and facing are of important use to geologists, especially in the analysis of more complex structures.

== Understanding vergence in folds ==
One of the main uses of vergence is to give an idea of the overall geometry of a fold by describing the symmetry or asymmetry of a fold. To better understand the importance of this use, it is important to understand the different classifications of folds, based on their geometry. The most commonly used terms to describe and classify folds, based on their geometry, are the terms antiforms and synforms, as well as anticlines and synclines. Although these terms sound similar, they mean very different things about the geometry of a fold.

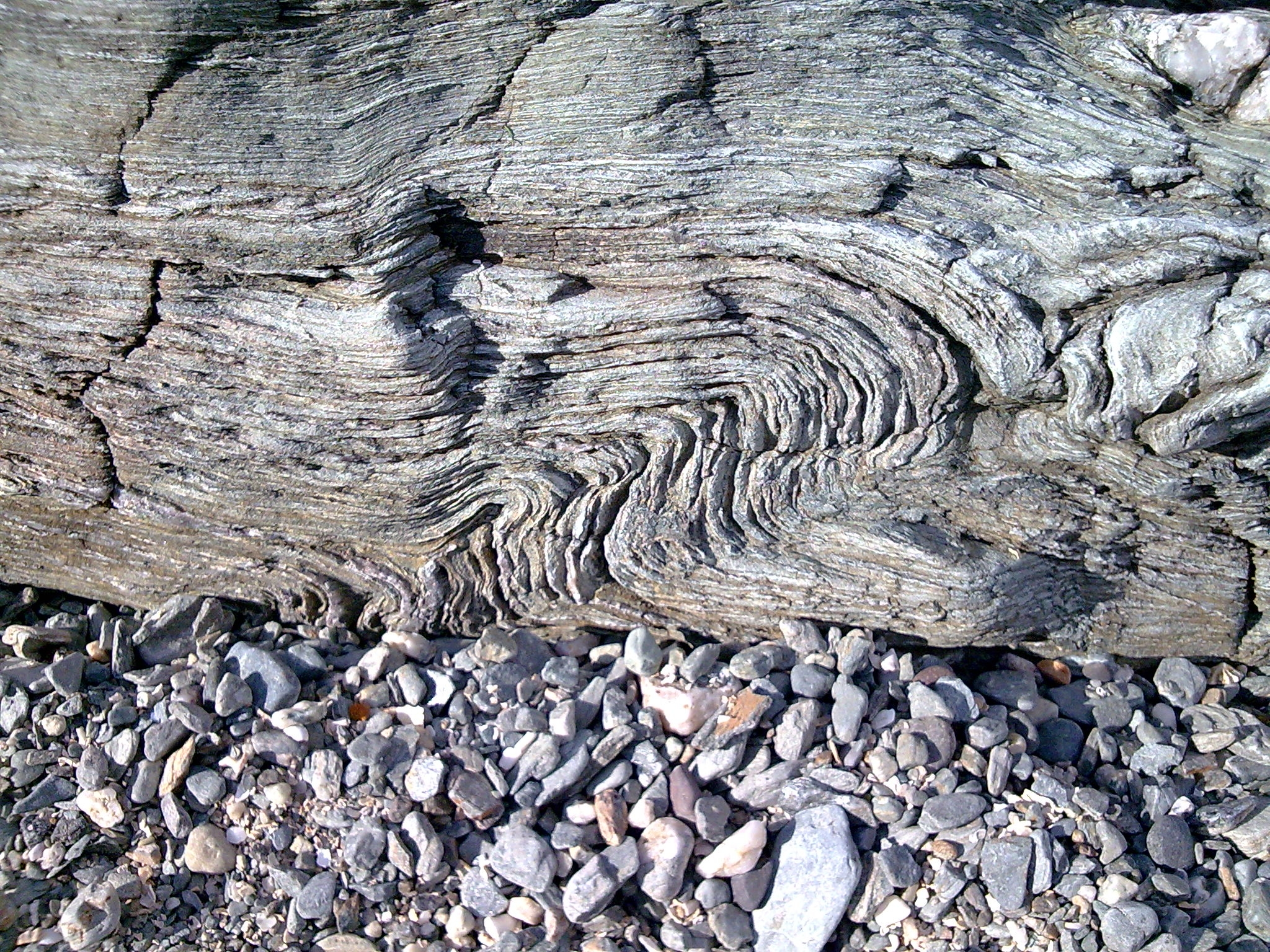
Small-scale rock folding

When the limbs of a fold converge upward, the fold is referred to as an antiform. Conversely, when the limbs of a fold converge downward, the fold is known as a synform. Not to be confused with these terms (antiform and synform), the terms anticline and syncline are used in the description of the stratigraphic significance of the fold. These phrases can be used in conjunction with one another to describe the geometric aspects of the shape and direction of the fold.

In addition, folds can be referred to as either symmetrical or asymmetrical. When a group of folds, whose axial planes are found to be perpendicular to the plane representing the enveloping surface of the folds (plane drawn tangential to the folds), the folds are considered symmetrical. When this is not the case, the folds are considered asymmetrical, and the asymmetry of these folds will vary systematically across the axial surfaces of the folds. Vergence can be used to, not only give an overall idea of the symmetry (or asymmetry) of a fold, but in the common case of asymmetric folds, it can be used to record the previously mentioned systematic variation of asymmetry of folds. This is very important to the use of vergence in the field for geologists when determining the micro-to-macro components of an area.

== Uses in geology ==
One of the main applications of vergence in geology is the tool it provides geologists to describe the geometries of folds on a small scale. Vergence, as well as the application of the facing of a fold, can assist geologists in classifying a fold in terms of its style (antiform or synform), as well as classifying it as an anticline or syncline, which holds stratigraphic significance. One of the most important uses of vergence is that it gives geologists a sense of the geometric property of symmetry in folds. In the case of asymmetric folds, vergence can be observed and recorded in structures known as fold pairs. Fold pairs help illustrate the angular relationship of the bedding and cleavage of the fold. They can be 'S-shaped', in which they are termed sinistral, or they can be 'Z-shaped', in which they are known as dextral. The conventional use of terms sinistral and dextral are used to describe vergence when the vantage point of observation is from above, or the observer is looking down on the fold.

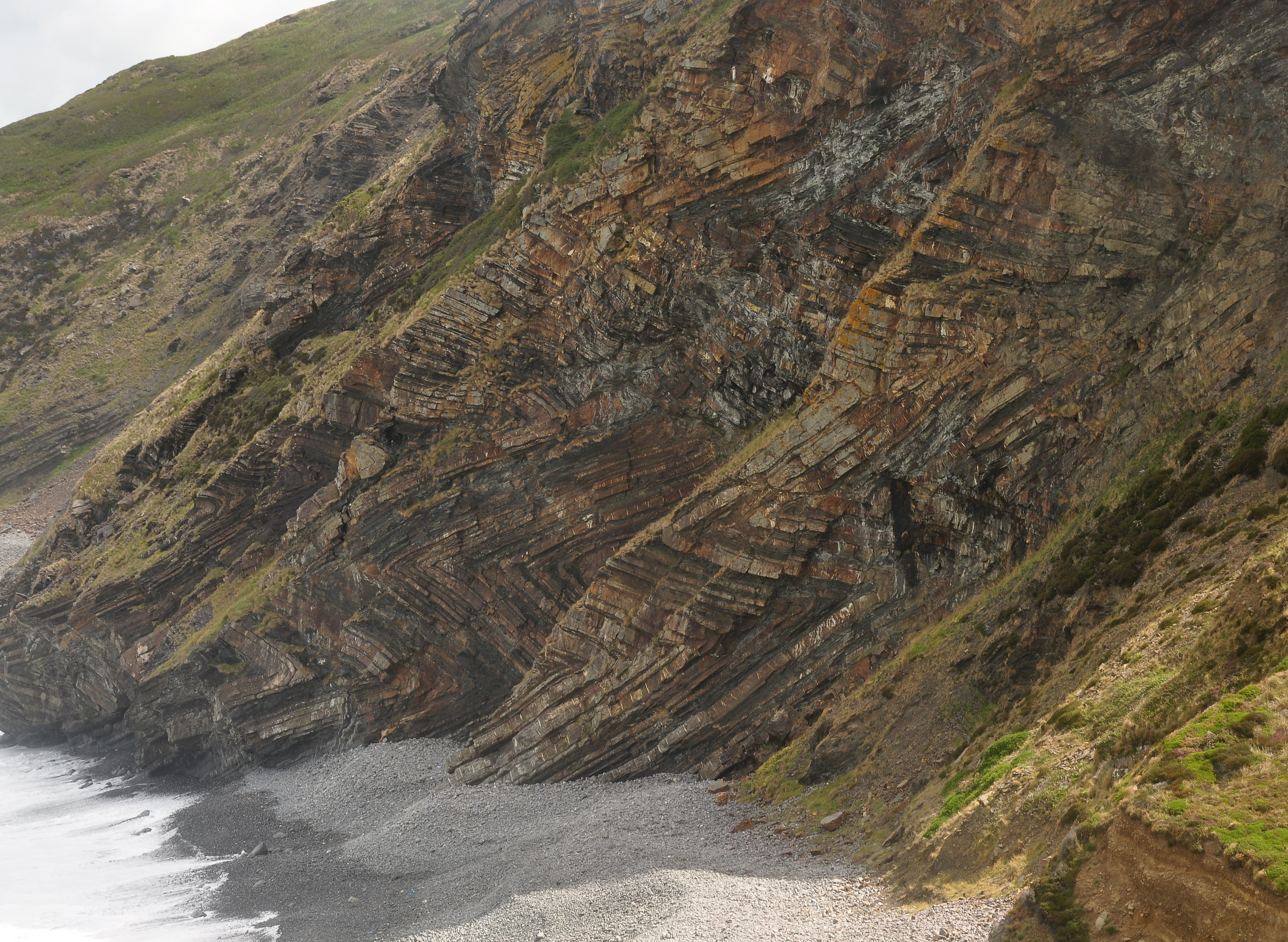
Folded rocks in Penhalt Cliff

Vergence, similarly to fold pairs, is sometimes classified as sinistral or dextral. This is because of the relationship between vergence and rotation, as in its definition, vergence is used to determine the direction of rotation of the upper component of a fold. Vergence can be classified as dextral, when there is apparent clockwise rotation, or sinistral, when there is apparent anticlockwise rotation. Although there is a shared relationship in the description of both vergence and fold pairs, they are independent of each other, as vergence is defined as a direction and not a shape. The use of vergence in describing the asymmetry of a fold is more useful than simply describing the asymmetry as either S-shaped (sinistral) or Z-shaped (dextral) because vergence is independent of fold plunge variations. Fold plunge variations are relatively common in folds, and based on these variations, two folds with similar asymmetry can be classified differently in terms of the shape being sinistral or dextral based on their fold plunge. This can result in inaccuracies in determining the geometries of folds, and therefore affect the mapping of larger areas. Overall, vergence can be very useful in the analysis of a folded pair, as the vergence can give a better understanding of the geometry of the folded pair, as well as be used to make determinations on the geometry of the larger area surrounding the fold. The vergence of a fold can help a geologist determine several characteristics of folding on a larger scale, including the style, position, and geometry of the folding.

By observing vergence in a fold, geologists can record data that can be used to calculate the approximate position and geometry of a larger area, and therefore assist geologists in mapping that area. More specifically, geologists use the property of vergence in smaller folds, to determine some of the physical properties of the larger, surrounding area where larger-scale folding is taking place. This is a common practice for geologists and is used in mapping out many areas such as the mapping of the Morcles Nappe in Switzerland. This process is especially useful in some instances, such as in the Otago Schists in New Zealand. Here, the only evidence of the existence of large-scale folding in the area is through the mapping of vergence zones. In areas of simple deformation, vergence can even be used as a tool to locate hinge zones of major folds, as well as the sense of shear. Using vergence as a tool to map out larger zones, should be used with caution in more complex areas where there have been multiple deformations. For instance, in areas of highly metamorphosed rocks, as well as in regions where tectonic movements of different ages are present, the use of vergence in the determination of characteristics of the larger area can be misleading. Despite this, vergence can be used in the description of more complex areas. As an example, changes in minor fold vergence, which occur across major fold areas, can help indicate when a major fold axis has been crossed. Overall, vergence provides a very useful tool to geologists in determining the components of larger-scale areas and structures.
