= Zimbabwe Craton =

Area in Southern Africa of ancient continental crust

- Date: Early Archean ( up to 3.46 Ga)
- Type: Craton

Southern Africa showing location of Zimbabwe Craton

The Zimbabwe craton is an area in Southern Africa of ancient continental crust, being a part of the ancient continent of Western Gondwana, with rocks dating back to the early Archean Eon, possibly as early as 3.46 billion years ago (Ga.). The craton is named after the country of Zimbabwe where the majority of the craton is. The rocks of the Zimbabwe Craton are separated from the rocks of the Kaapvaal craton to the southeast by the 250 kilometres (160 mi) wide Limpopo Belt of granulite facies tectonites. The Limpopo belt formed contemporaneously with the Zimbabwe and Kaapvaal cratons, but remained geologically active until much later. It was only in the late Archean, ca. 2.8-2.5 Ga., that the two cratons were stabilized together and that high-grade metamorphism ceased in the Limpopo Belt. North of the Zimbabwe Craton is the Zambezi Belt.

== Origin ==
The Zimbabwe Craton formed from the suture of two smaller blocks, the Tokwe Segment to the south and the much smaller Rhodesdale Segment (aka Rhodesdale gneiss), to the north. The rocks of these segments have been dated to as early as 3.46 Ga. The Tokwe Segment probably stabilized about 3.3 Ga., and there is evidence that the Rhodesdale Segment stabilized about the same time.

The synchroneity and extent of the Tokwe Segment is considered strong evidence supporting a predominantly intra-cratonic origin for the Late Archaean greenstone belts of Zimbabwe and refuting an arc accretion origin for the craton.
