= Congo Craton =

Precambrian craton that with four others makes up the modern continent of Africa

Approximate location of Mesoproterozoic (older than 1.3 Ga) cratons within South America–Africa in their Gondwana configuration (c. 550-130 Ma).

The Congo Craton, covered by the Palaeozoic-to-recent Congo Basin, is an ancient Precambrian craton that with four others (the Kaapvaal, Zimbabwe, Tanzania, and West African cratons) makes up the modern continent of Africa. These cratons were formed between about 3.6 and 2.0 billion years ago and have been tectonically stable since that time. All of these cratons are bounded by younger fold belts formed between 2.0 billion and 300 million years ago.

The Congo Craton occupies a large part of central southern Africa, extending from the Kasai region of the DRC into Sudan and Angola. It forms parts of the countries of Gabon, Cameroon, and the Central African Republic. A small portion extends into Zambia as well, where it is called the Bangweulu Block.

== Congo–São Francisco ==
The Congo Craton and the São Francisco Craton are stable Archaean blocks that formed a coherent landmass until the opening of the South Atlantic Ocean during the break-up of Gondwana (c. 2000–130 Ma). They stabilised during the Transamazonian orogeny and Eburnean Orogeny and have been affected by a long series of orogens since resulting in similar sequences on both blocks.

Congo–São Francisco experienced three large igneous province (LIP) events at 1380–1370 Ma, c. 1505 Ma, and c. 1110 Ma. The relative position of Congo–São Francisco within the supercontinent Nuna/Columbia can be reconstructed because these LIP events also affected other Precambrian continental blocks. Within Nuna the northern part of Siberia was located adjacent to western São Francisco. 1110 Ma dyke swarms in Angola are absent in Siberia but coincide with the Umkondo LIP on the Kalahari Craton and magmatic event in the Bundelkhand Craton in India, the Amazonian Craton in South America, and the Keweenawan Rift in Laurentia (although the latter was located far from the other continental blocks). A series of 1500 Ma dyke swarms also support the close relation between Congo–São Francisco and Siberia: Kuonamka in Siberia and Curaçá and Chapada Diamantina in São Francisco and Angola. These dyke swarms radiate from a mantle plume centre located in what is now north-eastern Siberia. Magmatic events in Congo (Kunene) and Siberia (Chieress) at 1384 Ma also corroborate the closeness of these two continents during at least 120 million years.

It is possible that the 1110 Ma LIP in Congo–São Francisco, Amazonia, and India was part of a much larger event that also involved West Africa and Kalahari (with a possible but unlikely link to the 1075 Ma Warakurna LIP in Australia). However, while the palaeo-latitudes of India and Kalahari are well constrained, those of Amazonia and Congo–São Francisco are not, making any plate tectonic reconstruction speculative.

At the time for the formation of the supercontinent Gondwana at c. 550 Ma the Congo Craton formed the already amalgamated central African landmass. The southern and eastern margins (modern coordinates) of this landmass was made of the Archaean Angola-Kasai block and Tanzanian Craton. These proto-Congo blocks were deformed in the Palaeoproterozoic Eburnean orogeny but later stabilised.

=== West Congo Belt ===
Before the opening of the South Atlantic the São Francisco and Congo cratons were connected by a "cratonic" bridge, the Bahia–Gabon Bridge. The most recent orogenic event on this bridge occurred at 2 Ga, so the connection between São Francisco and Congo must have formed during the Palaeoproterozoic. South of this cratonic bridge the Araçuaí–West Congo orogen evolved in the Neoproterozoic in a sea basin made of oceanic crust, an embayment in the São Francisco–Congo continent.

The West Congo Pan-African Belt includes major magmatic events at c. 1000 and 910 Ma. In the Early Neoproterozoic, the western edge of Congo Craton was the location for the initial rifting of Rodinia before its break-up. During the Neoproterozoic, Central Congo or Bas-Congo became a passive margin on which was deposited 4,000 m (13,000 ft) sediments. At the end of the Neoproterozoic, Bas-Congo was only affected by the Pan-African orogeny at 566 Ma to a limited extent protected by this passive margin and by the thickness of the craton. At 1000 Ma peralkaline magmatism initiated an early transtensional setting along the western edge of the Congo Craton. An LIP at c. 930–920 Ma was followed by felsic magmatism between c. 920–910 Ma which had a short emplacement interval and resulted in a 3,000–4,000 m (9,800–13,100 ft) thick sequence. Mafic-felsic magma sequences (6,000 m (20,000 ft) thick) on the western edge of the Congo Craton are similar to those of the Paraná and Deccan LIPs, but in the Congo Craton the magma source became shallower with time. There was no geodynamic activity along the western Congo margin during the Mesoproterozoic.

== See also ==
- Damara Orogeny
