= Pan-African orogeny =

Series of major mountain-forming events in the Neoproterozoic

The Pan-African orogeny was a series of major Neoproterozoic orogenic events which related to the formation of the supercontinents Gondwana and Pannotia about 600 million years ago. This orogeny is also known as the Pan-Gondwanan or Saldanian Orogeny. The Pan-African orogeny and the Grenville orogeny are the largest known systems of orogenies on Earth. The sum of the continental crust formed in the Pan-African orogeny and the Grenville orogeny makes the Neoproterozoic the period of Earth's history that has produced most continental crust.

== History and terminology ==
The term Pan-African was coined by Kennedy 1964 for a tectono-thermal event at about 500 Ma when a series of mobile belts in Africa formed between much older African cratons. At the time, other terms were used for similar orogenic events on other continents, i.e. Brasiliano in South America; Adelaidean in Australia; and Beardmore in Antarctica.

Later, when plate tectonics became generally accepted, the term Pan-African was extended to all of the supercontinent Gondwana. Because the formation of Gondwana encompassed several continents and extended from the Neoproterozoic to the early Palaeozoic, Pan-African could no longer be considered a single orogeny, but rather an orogenic cycle that included the opening and closing of several large oceans and the collisions of several continental blocks. Furthermore, the Pan-African events are contemporaneous with the Cadomian orogeny in Europe and the Baikalian orogeny in Asia, and crust from these areas were probably part of Pannotia (i.e. Gondwana when it first formed) during the Precambrian.

Attempts to correlate the African Pan-African belts with the South American Brasiliano belts on the other side of the Atlantic has in many cases been problematic.

== Pan-African belts ==
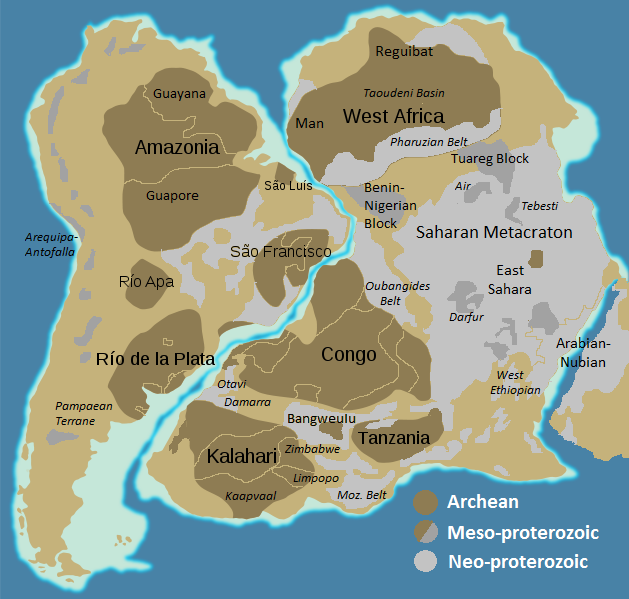
West Gondwana with major cratons in brown and Pan-African orogens in grey

Orogenic belts of the Pan-African system include:

- The Arabian-Nubian Shield, extending from Ethiopia to the southern Levant, it is associated with the opening of the Red Sea.
- The Mozambique Belt, extending from east Antarctica through East Africa up to the Arabian-Nubian Shield, formed as a suture between plates during the Pan-African orogeny. The Mozambique ocean began closing between Madagascar-India and the Congo–Tanzania craton between 700 and 580 million years ago, with closure between 600 and 500 million years ago.
- The Zambezi Belt branches off the Mozambique Belt in northern Zimbabwe and extends into Zambia.
- The Damara Belt is exposed in Namibia between the Congo and Kalahari cratons and continues southwards into the coastal Gariep and Saldania Belts and northwards into the Kaoko Belt. It is the result of closure of the Adamastor and Damara oceans and includes two horizons associated with a severe equator-ward glaciation explained by the Snowball Earth hypothesis.
- The Lufilian Arc is most likely a continuation of the Damara Belt in Namibia to which it connects in northern Botswana. It is a broad arc reaching as far north as the southern DRC and Zambia.
- The Gariep and Saldania belts run along the western and southern edge of the Kalahari Craton. Also the result of the closure of the Adamastor Ocean, the marine deposits, seamounts, and, ophiolites they contain were accreted onto the Kalahari margin around 540 Ma. They include the granite at Sea Point, Cape Town visited by Charles Darwin in 1836.
- The Kaoko Belt branches north-west from the Damara Belt into Angola. Also produced by the closure of the Adamastor Ocean, this belt includes a shear zone known as the 733–550 Ma-old Puros lineament in southern Angola. It contains 2030–1450 Ma-old, strongly deformed basement rocks, probably derived from the Congo Craton, mixed with Late Archaean granitoid gneisses of unknown origin. No island arcs or ophiolote are known from the Kaoko Belt.
- The West Congo Belt is the product of 999–912 Ma-old rifting along the western margin of the Congo Craton followed by the formation of a foreland basin onto which the belt was deposited 900–570 Ma. In the western belt allochthonous Palaeo- and Mesoproterozoic basement rocks override the foreland sequence. It includes glacial deposits similar to those in the Lufilian Arc and is conjugate to the Araçuaí Belt in Brazil.
- The 3000 km-long Trans–Saharan Belt runs north and east of the more than 2000 Ma-old West African Craton bordering the Tuareg and Nigerian shields. It consists of a strongly deformed pre-Neoproterozoic basement and Neoproterozoic oceanic rocks containing ophiolite, accretionary prisms, arc-related and high-pressure metamorphic rocks dated to 900–520 Ma.
- The Central African belts between the Congo and Nigerian shields consists of Neoproterozoic rocks and deformed granitoids interlayered with wedges of Palaeoproterozoic basement. The southern part is the product of a continental collision during which it was thrust onto the Congo Craton. The central and northern parts are thrust-and-shear zones correlated with similar structures in Brazil. The belts in Central Africa continue east as the Oubanguide Belt with which they form the Central African Shear Zone.
- The Saharan Metacraton between the Hoggar Mountains and the Nile river consists of an Archaean-Palaeoproterozoic basement overprinted by Pan-African granitoids.
- The Rokelide Belt passes along the western margin of the Archaean Man Shield in the southern West African Craton. It was intensely deformed during the Pan-African orogeny with a peak reached around 560 Ma and can be an accretionary belt.

== Sources ==
- Cutten, Huntly N.C. (October 29, 2002). "The Mozambique Belt, Eastern Africa – Tectonic Evolution of the Mozambique Ocean and Gondwana Amalgamation". The Geological Society of America. Archived from the original on 2016-06-04.
- "Glossary of Plate Tectonic and Paleogeographic Terms" (PDF). Archived from the original (PDF) on 2006-06-18. (not available without registration (free))
- Grantham, G.H.; Maboko, M.; Eglington, B.M. (2003). "A review of the evolution of the Mozambique Belt and implications for the amalgamation and dispersal of Rodinia and Gondwana". Proterozoic East Gondwana: supercontinent assembly and breakup. Geological Society. ISBN 1-86239-125-4.
- van Hinsbergen, D. J. J. (2011). The Formation and Evolution of Africa: A Synopsis of 3.8 Ga of Earth History. Geological Society of London. ISBN 9781862393356.
- Kennedy, W. Q. (1964). The structural differentiation of Africa in the Pan-African (±500 my) tectonic episode. Annual Reports of the Institute of African Geology. Vol. 8. Leeds University. pp. 48–49.
- Kröner, A.; Stern, R. J. (2004). "Pan-African Orogeny". In Selley, R. C.; Cocks, R.; Plimer, I. (eds.). Encyclopedia of Geology. Vol. 1. Amsterdam: Elsevier. pp. 1–12. ISBN 9780126363807.
- Meert, J.G. (2003). "A synopsis of events related to the assembly of eastern Gondwana". Tectonophysics. 362 (1–4): 1–40. doi:10.1016/S0040-1951(02)00629-7.
