= Tanzania Craton =

Old and stable part of the continental lithosphere in central Tanzania

Approximate location of Mesoproterozoic (older than 1.3 Ga) cratons in South America and Africa.

The Tanzania Craton is an old and stable part of the continental lithosphere in central Tanzania. Some of the rocks are over 3 billion years old.

== Setting ==
The Tanzania Craton forms the highest part of the East African Plateau. The craton is surrounded by Proterozoic mobile belts of various ages and grades of metamorphism. These include the Ubendian, Usagaran, Karagwe-Ankolean and Bukoban systems. The Mozambique Belt lies to the east. The craton divides the east and west branches of the East African Rift. The southern end of the Gregory Rift Valley terminates against the craton. The volcanic area of this rift covers the surface interface between the Mozambique orogenic fold belt and the Tanzania Craton. A superplume exists beneath the craton. An indirect effect of rift and plume associated volcanism in the Tanzania Craton is the high levels of soil nutrients in Serengeti provided by volcanic ash from Ol Doinyo Lengai.

== Composition ==
The craton is a composite of several different terranes of Archaean metasediments. The Dodoman is the oldest, and others include the Nyanzian and Kavirondian. Some of the greenstone belts are more than 3 billion years old. They were intruded by granites and migmatized in different events that date back to 2.9, 2.7, 2.4 and 1.85 billion years ago. The craton mainly consists of Archaean granitic complexes, but also includes rocks from the Dodoma System in the central area, and belts of greenstone to the south and east of Lake Victoria. Gneisses, schists, quartzites, migmatites, amphibolites and granulite are also found. There was widespread intrusion of kimberlites in the Cretaceous Period, mostly in the part of the craton that lies south of Lake Victoria. This includes the Mwadui kimberlite pipe in the center of Tanzania.

== Sources ==
- Dawson, John Barry (2008). The Gregory rift valley and Neogene-recent volcanoes of northern Tanzania. Geological Society. ISBN 978-1-86239-267-0.
- "GEOLOGICAL FRAMEWORK AND REGIONAL METALLOGENY OF TANZANIA" (PDF). Kilimanjaro Mining Company. Archived from the original (PDF) on 2019-10-08.
- van Straaten, Peter (2009). "Tanzania" (PDF). Rocks for Crops. University of Guelph. Archived from the original (PDF) on 2017-05-17.
