= Kalahari Craton =

African geological area

Approximate location of Mesoproterozoic (older than 1.3 Ga) cratons in South America and Africa.

The Kalahari Craton is a craton, an old and stable part of the continental lithosphere, that occupies large portions of South Africa, Botswana, Namibia and Zimbabwe. It consists of two cratons separated by the Limpopo Belt: the larger Kaapvaal Craton to the south and the smaller Zimbabwe Craton to the north. The Namaqua Belt is the southern margin of the Kaapvaal Craton.

Parts of the Kalahari Craton are now in East Antarctica (the Grunehogna Craton) and West Antarctica (Haag Nunataks) and the Falkland Islands. The name was introduced by T.N. Clifford in 1970.

== Formation ==
Following a terminology introduced in 2008, the Archaean-Palaeoproterozoic core of the craton is called the Proto-Kalahari Craton. This core plus accreted Mesoproterozoic crust and dispersed non-African fragments compose the Kalahari Craton. Before the Pan-African Orogeny, the Kalahari Craton was much larger than it is today, but its sutures and therefore its extent are difficult to locate due to later overprinting.

The Kaapvaal Craton, Zimbabwe Craton, and Limpopo Belt are made of Archaean terranes and contain crust at least 3.2 Ga and are underlain by a thick (250 km (160 mi)) layer of buoyant mantle that is producing garnets and diamonds.

During the Palaeoproterozoic the northwest margin of the Archaean core grew by accretion and had formed a Proto-Kalahari Craton by 1.75 Ga. During the period 1.4–1.0 Ga subduction occurred along the northwest margin followed by continental collisions along the eastern and southern margins. By this time enough Mesoproterozoic crust had accreted to transform the Kalahari Craton. At 1.11 Ga, during the assembly of the supercontinent Rodinia, the Kalahari Craton was affected by the Umkondo-Borg Large Igneous Province. At c. 1.15–.98 Ga the Kalahari Craton collided with the eastern margin of Laurentia.

== See also ==
- Geology of Namibia
- Geology of South Africa
- Copperbelt Province
