= Outline of plate tectonics =

Hierarchical outline list of articles related to plate tectonics

This is a list of articles related to plate tectonics and tectonic plates.

== What is plate tectonics? ==
Map of Earth's 16 principal tectonic plates Convergent: Collision zone Subduction zone Divergent: Extension zone Spreading centre Transform: Dextral transform Sinistral transform

Plate tectonics (from Latin tectonicus, from Ancient Greek τεκτονικός (tektonikós) 'pertaining to building') is the scientific theory that Earth's lithosphere comprises a number of large tectonic plates, which have been slowly moving since 3–4 billion years ago. The model builds on the concept of continental drift, an idea developed during the first decades of the 20th century. Plate tectonics came to be accepted by geoscientists after seafloor spreading was validated in the mid- to late 1960s. The processes that result in plates and shape Earth's crust are called tectonics.

Earth's lithosphere, the rigid outer shell of the planet including the crust and upper mantle, is fractured into seven or eight major plates (depending on how they are defined) and many minor plates or "platelets". Where the plates meet, their relative motion determines the type of plate boundary (or fault): convergent, divergent, or transform. The relative movement of the plates typically ranges from zero to 10 cm annually. Faults tend to be geologically active, with earthquakes, volcanic activity, mountain-building, and oceanic trench formation.

Tectonic plates are composed of the oceanic lithosphere and the thicker continental lithosphere, each topped by its own kind of crust. Along convergent plate boundaries, the process of subduction carries the edge of one plate down under the other plate and into the mantle. This process reduces the total surface area (crust) of Earth. The lost surface is balanced by the formation of new oceanic crust along divergent margins by seafloor spreading, keeping the total surface area constant in a tectonic "conveyor belt".

While Earth is the only planet known to currently have active plate tectonics, evidence suggests that other planets and moons have experienced or exhibit forms of tectonic activity. Jupiter's moon Europa shows signs of ice crustal plates moving and interacting, similar to Earth's plate tectonics. Mars and Venus are thought to have had tectonic activity in the past, though not of the same form as Earth.

Tectonic plates are relatively rigid and float across the ductile asthenosphere beneath. Lateral density variations in the mantle result in convection currents, the slow creeping motion of Earth's solid mantle. At a seafloor spreading ridge, plates move away from the ridge, which is a topographic high, and the newly formed crust cools as it moves away, increasing its density and contributing to the motion. At a subduction zone, the relatively cold, dense oceanic crust sinks down into the mantle, forming the downward convecting limb of a mantle cell, which is the strongest driver of plate motion. The relative importance and interaction of other proposed factors such as active convection, upwelling inside the mantle, and tidal drag of the Moon are subjects of debate. (Full article...)

== General concepts ==
- Asthenosphere – Highly viscous, ductile, and mechanically weak region of Earth's mantle
- Aulacogen – Failed arm of a triple junction, an inactive rift zone
- Back-arc basin – Submarine features associated with island arcs and subduction zones
- Bimodal volcanism – Eruption of both mafic and felsic lavas from a single volcanic centre
- Continent – Large geographical region identified by convention
- Crust – Outermost solid shell of astronomical bodies
- Epeirogenic movement – Upheavals or depressions of land exhibiting long wavelengths and little folding
- Fault (geology) – Fracture or discontinuity in displaced rock
  - Fault mechanics – Field of study that investigates the behavior of geologic faults
  - Active fault – Geological fault likely to be the source of an earthquake sometime in the future
- Flux melting – Reduction in melting point of solid rock
- Geodynamics – Study of dynamics of the Earth
- Island arc – Arc-shaped volcanic archipelago
- Mantle – Layer inside a planetary-mass object
- Mohorovičić discontinuity – Boundary between the Earth's crust and the mantle
- Mountain – Large natural elevation of the Earth's surface
- Mid-ocean ridge, also known as Oceanic ridge – Basaltic underwater mountain system formed by plate tectonic spreading
- Oceanic trench – Long and narrow depressions of the sea floor
- Paleoclimatology – Study of changes in ancient climate
- Paleomap – Map of continents and mountain ranges in the past based on plate reconstructions
- Seamount – Mountain rising from the ocean seafloor that does not reach the water's surface
- Slab (geology) – Portion of a tectonic plate that is being subducted
- Slab gap hypothesis – Theory in plate tectonics
- Slab window – Type of gap in a subducted oceanic plate
- Supercontinent – Landmass comprising more than one continental core, or craton
- Terrane – Fragment of crust formed on one tectonic plate and accreted to another
- Volcano – Rupture in a planet's crust where material escapes

=== Tectonic plate interactions ===
Tectonic plate interactions – Types of plate boundaries

- Continental drift – Movement of Earth's continents relative to each other
- Convergent boundary – Region of active deformation between colliding tectonic plates
- Divergent boundary – Linear feature between two tectonic plates
- Extensional tectonics – Geological process of stretching planet crust
- Isostasy – State of gravitational equilibrium between Earth's crust and mantle
- Leaky transform fault – Transform fault producing new crust
- Mantle convection – Gradual movement of the planet's mantle
- Obduction – Geological process at tectonic plate boundaries
- Orogeny – Formation of mountain ranges
- Passive margin – Transition between oceanic and continental lithosphere that is not an active plate margin
- Plume tectonics – Geophysical theory of movement of mantle plumes under tectonic plates
- Ridge push – Proposed driving force for tectonic plate motion
- Seafloor spreading – Geological process at mid-ocean ridges
- Strike-slip tectonics – Deformation dominated by horizontal movement in Earth's lithosphere
- Subduction – Geological process at tectonic plate boundaries
- Tectonic uplift – Geologic uplift of Earth's surface that is attributed to plate tectonics
- Thrust tectonics – Concept in structural geology
- Transform fault, also known as Transform boundary – Plate boundary where the motion is predominantly horizontal
- Triple junction – Meeting point of three tectonic plates

== Back arc basins ==
Back-arc basin – Submarine features associated with island arcs and subduction zones

== Continents ==
Continent – Large geographical region identified by convention

- Africa – Continent
- Antarctica – Earth's southernmost continent
- Asia – Continent
- Australia (continent) – One of Earth's seven main divisions of land
- Europe – Continent
- North America – Continent
- South America – Continent

=== Paleocontinents ===
Paleocontinent – Major landmass in the geological past

- Amazonian Craton – Geologic province in South America
- Appalachia (Mesozoic) – Mesozoic land mass separated from Laramidia to the west by the Western Interior Seaway
- Arctica – Ancient continent in the Neoarchean era
- Armorican terrane – Microcontinent or group of continental fragments rifted away from Gondwana
- Asiamerica – Northern landmass that formed part of the Pangaea supercontinent
- Atlantica – Ancient continent formed during the Proterozoic about 2 billion years ago
- Australia (continent) – One of Earth's seven main divisions of land (Also known as Sahul)
- Avalonia – Microcontinent in the Paleozoic era
- Baltica – Late-Proterozoic to early-Palaeozoic continent
- Cathaysia – Late Paleozoic microcontinent
- Chilenia – Ancient microcontinent, containing central Chile and western Argentina
- Chiloé Block – Tectonic unit under Chile
- Cimmeria (continent) – Ancient string of microcontinents that rifted from Gondwana
- Congo Craton – Precambrian craton that with four others makes up the modern continent of Africa
- Chilenia – Ancient microcontinent, containing central Chile and western Argentina
- Cuyania – Ancient microcontinent now part of Argentina
- Laramidia – Island continent that existed until the end of the Late Cretaceous period
- Iberian plate – Small tectonic plate now part of the Eurasian plate
- Insular India – Isolated land mass which became the Indian subcontinent
- Kalahari Craton – African geological area
- Kazakhstania – Geological region in Central Asia
- Kerguelen Plateau – Oceanic plateau in the southern Indian Ocean
- Laramidia – Island continent that existed until the end of the Late Cretaceous period
- Laurentia – Craton forming the geological core of North America
- Mauritia (microcontinent) – Precambrian microcontinent that broke off India and Madagascar
- North China Craton – Continental crustal block in China, Inner Mongolia, the Yellow Sea, and North Korea
- Pampia – Ancient microcontinent or terrane
- Río de la Plata Craton – Medium-sized continental block in Uruguay, eastern Argentina and southern Brazil
- São Francisco Craton – Ancient craton in eastern South America
- Siberia (continent) – Ancient craton forming the Central Siberian Plateau
- South China Craton – Precambrian continental block located in China
- Sundaland – Biogeographic region of Southeast Asia
- Supercontinent – Landmass comprising more than one continental core, or craton
  - Columbia (supercontinent) – Ancient supercontinent of approximately 2,500 to 1,500 million years ago
  - Euramerica – Northern landmass that formed part of the Pangaea supercontinent
  - Gondwana – Neoproterozoic to Cretaceous landmass
  - Kenorland – Hypothetical Neoarchaean supercontinent from about 2.8 billion years ago
  - Laurasia – Northern landmass that formed part of the Pangaea supercontinent
  - Nena (supercontinent) – Early Proterozoic supercontinent
  - Pangaea – Supercontinent from the late Paleozoic to early Mesozoic eras
  - Pannotia – Hypothesized Neoproterozoic supercontinent
  - Rodinia – Hypothetical Neoproterozoic supercontinent
  - Ur (continent) – Hypothetical Archaean supercontinent from about 3.1 billion years ago
  - Vaalbara – Hypothetical Archaean supercontinent from about 3.6 to 2.7 billion years ago
  - Eurasia - geographic landmass containing Europe and Asia

== Earthquakes ==
Earthquake – Sudden movement of the Earth's crust

- Blind thrust earthquake – Movement along a thrust fault that is not visible at the surface
- Intraplate earthquake – Earthquake that occurs within the interior of a tectonic plate
- Interplate earthquake – Earthquake that occurs at the boundary between two tectonic plates
- Megathrust earthquake – Type of earthquake at convergent plate boundaries

== Oceans ==
Ocean – Body of salt water covering most of Earth

=== Ancient oceans ===
List of ancient oceans – List of Earth's former oceans

- Adamastor Ocean – Precambrian "proto-Atlantic" ocean in the Southern Hemisphere
- Boreal Sea – Mesozoic-era seaway that lay along the northern border of Laurasia
- Bridge River Ocean – Ancient ocean between North America and the Insular Islands during the Mesozoic
- Central American Seaway – Body of water
- Goianides Ocean – Ocean in South America in Neoproterozoic
- Goiás Ocean – Major shear zone that developed in the Precambrian
- Hudson Seaway – Major seaway of North America during the Cretaceous Period
- Iapetus Ocean – Ocean that existed in the late Neoproterozoic and early Paleozoic eras
- Khanty Ocean – Small Precambrian ocean between Baltica and the Siberian continent
- Lapland-Kola Ocean – Geology of Norway, Finland and Russia
- Mirovia – Hypothesized superocean surrounding the supercontinent Rodinia in the Neoproterozoic Era
- Paleo-Tethys Ocean – Ocean on the margin of Gondwana between the Middle Cambrian and Late Triassic
- Pan-African Ocean – Hypothesized paleo-ocean whose closure created the supercontinent of Pannotia
- Pannonian Sea – Shallow ancient sea where the Pannonian Basin in Central Europe is today
- Panthalassa – Prehistoric superocean that surrounded Pangaea
- Paratethys – Prehistoric shallow inland sea in Eurasia
- Pharusian Ocean – Ancient ocean that existed from 800 to 635 million years ago
- Piemont-Liguria Ocean – Former piece of oceanic crust that is seen as part of the Tethys Ocean
- Poseidon Ocean – Supposed ocean that existed in the Mesoproterozoic period
- Pre-Svecofennian Ocean – Geological processes in Sweden, Finland, and Russia
- Proto-Tethys Ocean – Ancient ocean that existed from the latest Ediacaran to the Carboniferous
- Rheic Ocean – Ancient ocean which separated two major palaeocontinents, Gondwana and Laurussia
- Slide Mountain Ocean – Ancient ocean between the Intermontane Islands and North America
- Sundance Sea – Jurassic inland sea
- Tethys Ocean – Prehistoric ocean between Gondwana and Laurasia
- Tornquist Sea – Sea between the palaeocontinents Avalonia and Baltica about 600 to 450 million years ago
- Turgai Sea – Large shallow body of salt water of the Mesozoic and Cenozoic Eras
- Ural Ocean – Small, ancient ocean between Siberia and Baltica
- Valais Ocean – Subducted ocean basin. Remnants found in the Alps in the North Penninic nappes.
- Western Interior Seaway – Prehistoric inland sea that split the continent of North America

==== Superoceans ====
Superocean – Ocean that surrounds a supercontinent

- Mirovia – Hypothesized superocean surrounding the supercontinent Rodinia in the Neoproterozoic Era
- Pan-African Ocean – Hypothesized paleo-ocean whose closure created the supercontinent of Pannotia
- Panthalassa – Prehistoric superocean that surrounded Pangaea

== Orogenies ==
Orogeny – Formation of mountain ranges

- List of orogenies – Known mountain building events of the Earth's history
- Mountain formation – Geological processes that underlie the formation of mountains
- Fold mountains – Mountains formed by compressive crumpling of the layers of rock
- Algoman orogeny – Late Archaean episode of mountain building in what is now North America

== Rifts ==
Rift – Geological linear zone where the lithosphere is being pulled apart

- Mid-ocean ridge – Basaltic underwater mountain system formed by plate tectonic spreading
- Saint Lawrence rift system – Seismically active zone paralleling the Saint Lawrence River

=== Active rifts ===
- Propagating rift – Seafloor geological feature

==== Continental rifts ====
- Afar Triangle – Geological depression caused by the Afar triple junction
- East African Rift – Active continental rift zone in East Africa
- Laptev Sea Rift – Tectonic boundary between the North American and Eurasian Plates

==== Oceanic ridges ====
- Aden Ridge – Rift portion in Gulf of Aden
- Cocos Ridge – Aseismic ridge within the Cocos plate
- Explorer Ridge – Mid-ocean ridge west of British Columbia, Canada
- Gorda Ridge – Tectonic spreading center off the northern coast of California and southern Oregon
- Juan de Fuca Ridge – Divergent plate boundary off the coast of the Pacific Northwest region of North America
- South American–Antarctic Ridge – Mid-ocean ridge in the South Atlantic
- Chile Rise – Submarine oceanic ridge in the Pacific Ocean
- East Pacific Rise – Ridge on the floor of the Pacific Ocean
- East Scotia Ridge – Minor oceanic tectonic plate between the Antarctic and South American plates
- Gakkel Ridge – Mid-oceanic ridge under the Arctic Ocean(Mid-Arctic Ridge)
- Nazca Ridge – Submarine ridge off the coast of Peru
- Pacific-Antarctic Ridge – Tectonic plate boundary in the South Pacific Ocean
- Central Indian Ridge – North-south-trending mid-ocean ridge in the western Indian Ocean
  - Carlsberg Ridge – Tectonic plate ridge
- Southeast Indian Ridge – Mid-ocean ridge in the southern Indian Ocean
- Southwest Indian Ridge – Mid-ocean ridge in the Indian and Atlantic Oceans
- Mid-Atlantic Ridge – Atlantic Ocean tectonic plate boundary
  - Kolbeinsey Ridge (North of Iceland)
  - Mohns Ridge
  - Knipovich – Russian zoologist Ridge (between Greenland and Spitsbergen)
  - Reykjanes Ridge – Atlantic Ocean tectonic plate boundary (South of Iceland)

=== Aulacogens ===
Aulacogen – Failed arm of a triple junction, an inactive rift zone

- Adelaide Rift Complex – Major geological province in Australia
- Alpha Ridge – Major volcanic ridge under the Arctic Ocean
- Aegir Ridge – Extinct mid-ocean ridge in the far-northern Atlantic Ocean
- Anza trough – Rift in Kenya that was formed in the Jurassic Period
- Bahr el Arab rift – Major geological feature in the southwest Sudan
- Benue Trough – Major geological structure underlying a large part of Nigeria
- Central Lowlands – Geologically defined area of relatively low-lying land in southern Scotland
- Eastern North America Rift Basins – Assemblage of Upper Triassic and Lower Jurassic sedimentary rocks
- Fundy Basin – Sediment-filled rift basin on the Atlantic coast of southeastern Canada
- Gulf of Suez Rift – Ancient geological rift
- Gulf St Vincent – Inlet in South Australia
- Kula-Farallon Ridge – Ancient mid-ocean ridge
- Melut Basin – Rift basin in South Sudan
- Midcontinent Rift System – Geological rift in the center of the North American continent
- Mississippi embayment – Low-lying basin filled with Cretaceous to recent sediments
- Muglad Basin – Large rift basin in southern Sudan and South Sudan
- Narmada River – River in central India
- New Madrid Seismic Zone – Major seismic zone in the southern and midwestern United States
- Newark Basin – Rift basin in northeast US
- Nipigon Embayment – Inactive continental rift zone in Northwestern Ontario, Canada
- Oslo Graben – Inactive Permian geological rift in Norway
- Ottawa-Bonnechere Graben – Rift valley extending from near Montréal through Ottawa in Canada
- Pacific-Farallon Ridge – Spreading ridge during the Late Cretaceous
- Pacific-Kula Ridge – Former mid-ocean ridge
- Phoenix Ridge – Ancient mid-ocean ridge between the Phoenix and Pacific plates
- Saguenay Graben – Rift valley in the geological Grenville Province of southern Quebec, Canada
- Southern Oklahoma Aulacogen – Failed rift of tectonic plates in the southern US
- Spencer Gulf – Large inlet in South Australia
- Timiskaming Graben – Northwesterly extension of the Ottawa-Bonnechere Graben
- Wichita Mountains – Mountains in the US state of Oklahoma

== Subduction zones ==
Subduction zone – Geological process at tectonic plate boundaries

- Middle America Trench – Subduction zone in the eastern Pacific off the southwestern coast of Middle America

== Suture zones ==
Suture (geology) – Joining together of separate terranes along a major fault zone

- Great Falls Tectonic Zone – Major intracontinental shear zone between the Hearne craton and Wyoming craton
- Huincul Fault – Fault that extends from the Neuquén Basin eastwards into the Argentine Shelf
- Iapetus Suture – Ancient geological fault
- Indus-Yarlung suture zone – Tectonic suture in southern Tibet
- Jormua Ophiolite – Remnant of ancient oceanic lithosphere near Jormua, Finland
- Magallanes-Fagnano Fault – Continental transform fault between the Scotia plate and the South American plate
- Morais ophiolite complex – Metamorphic complex of oceanic and continental crust terranes in Portugal
- Periadriatic Seam – Border between the Adriatic and European plates
- Pieniny Klippen Belt – Zone in the Western Carpathians, with a very complex geological structure
- Trans-European Suture Zone – Boundary between the East European Craton and the orogens of South-Western Europe
- Vulcan structure – Tectonic boundary in North America

== Tectonic plates ==
Tectonic plate – Movement of Earth's lithosphere

- List of tectonic plates
- African plate – Tectonic plate underlying Africa
- Anatolian plate – Continental tectonic plate comprising most of the Anatolian Peninsula (Asia Minor)
- Antarctic plate – Major tectonic plate containing Antarctica and the surrounding ocean floor
- Arabian plate – Minor tectonic plate
- Burma plate – Minor tectonic plate in Southeast Asia
- Cocos plate – Tectonic plate beneath the Pacific Ocean
- Eurasian plate – Tectonic plate which includes most of Eurasia
- Explorer plate – Northeast Pacific tectonic plate
- Farallon plate – Ancient oceanic plate that has mostly subducted under the North American plate
- Gorda plate – One of the northern remnants of the Farallon plate
- Indian plate – Minor plate that separated from Gondwana
- Juan de Fuca plate – Small tectonic plate in the eastern North Pacific
- Halmahera plate – Small tectonic plate in the Molucca Sea
- Indo-Australian plate – Major tectonic plate formed by the fusion of the Indian and Australian plates
- Pacific plate – Oceanic tectonic plate under the Pacific Ocean
- Molucca Sea plate – Small fully subducted tectonic plate near Indonesia
- Nazca plate – Oceanic tectonic plate in the eastern Pacific Ocean basin
- North American plate – Large tectonic plate including most of North America, Greenland and part of Siberia
- Philippine Sea plate – Oceanic tectonic plate to the east of the Philippines
- South American plate – Major tectonic plate
- Sunda plate – Tectonic plate including Southeast Asia

== Terranes ==
terrane – Fragment of crust formed on one tectonic plate and accreted to another

- Arctic Alaska-Chukotka terrane – Terrane that includes parts of Alaska, Siberia and the continental shelf between them
- Arequipa-Antofalla – South American geology
- Armorican Massif – Geologic massif that covers a large area in the northwest of France
- Armorican terrane – Microcontinent or group of continental fragments rifted away from Gondwana
- Avalonia – Microcontinent in the Paleozoic era
- Briançonnais zone – Piece of continental crust in the Penninic nappes of the Alps
- Bronson Hill Arc – Bimodal volcanic arc and associated Ordovician sediments
- Buffalo Head terrane – Terrane in the western Canadian Shield in northern Alberta
- Cache Creek terrane – Geologic terrane in British Columbia and southern Yukon, Canada
- Carolina terrane – Exotic terrane from central Georgia to central Virginia in the United States
- Cassiar terrane – Cretaceous terrane in Canada
- Chilenia – Ancient microcontinent, containing central Chile and western Argentina
- Chiloé Block – Tectonic unit under Chile
- Cuyania – Ancient microcontinent now part of Argentina
- Cymru terrane – Inferred fault bounded terrane of the basement rocks of the southern United Kingdom
- Florida Platform – Geological feature
- Franciscan Assemblage – Late Mesozoic terrane of heterogeneous rocks in the California Coast Ranges
- Ganderia – Terrane in the northern Appalachians which broke off the supercontinent Gondwana
- Gascoyne Complex – Granite and metamorphic rock in Western Australia
- Great Lakes tectonic zone – Geologic province
- Great Valley Sequence – Group of late Mesozoic formations in the Central Valley of California
- Hebridean terrane – Part of the Caledonian orogenic belt in northwest Scotland
- Hottah terrane – Paleoproterozoic terrane in the northwestern end of the Canadian Shield
- Irumide Belt – Mesoproterozoic terrane on the southern margin of the Bangweulu Block in Zambia
- Ivrea zone – Tectonic terrane in the Italian Alps
- Lhasa terrane – Fragment of crustal material that forms present-day southern Tibet
- Madre de Dios terrane – Distinct fragment of Earth's crust in southwestern Patagonia
- Meguma terrane – Terrane exposed in southern Nova Scotia
- Narooma terrane – Geological structural region on the south coast of New South Wales, Australia
- Narryer Gneiss terrane – Geological complex of ancient rocks in Western Australia
- Omineca Arc – Volcanic arc terrane in western North America
- Pampia – Ancient microcontinent or terrane
- Pelso plate – Small tectonic unit in the Pannonian Basin in Europe
- Salinian Block – Terrane west of the main trace of the San Andreas Fault system in California
- Shan–Thai terrane – Mass of continental crust extending from Tibet into Southeast Asia
- Slide Mountain terrane – Late Paleozoic terrane in British Columbia, Canada
- Smartville Block – Volcanic arc accreted onto the North American Plate
- Sonoma Volcanics – Geologic formation of volcanic origin in California
- Sonomia terrane – Crustal block accreted onto the North American Plate in Northwest Nevada
- Spavinaw terrane – Intrusive and volcanic rocks in the mid-continent region of the United States
- Stikinia – Fragment of Earth's crust in British Columbia, Canada
- Tuareg Shield – West African geological formation
- Western Gneiss region – Large geological unit in Norway, part of the Baltic shield
- Wrangellia terrane – Geological area in northwestern North America
- Wrekin terrane – Inferred basement rock terrane of the southern United Kingdom
- Yakutat Block – Earth crust fragment in Alaska
- Yukon–Tanana terrane – Largest tectonostratigraphic terrane in the northern North American Cordillera

== Triple junctions ==
Triple junction – Meeting point of three tectonic plates

- Aden-Owen-Carlsberg triple junction – Junction of three tectonic plates in the northwest Indian Ocean
- Afar triple junction – Place where three tectonic rifts meet in East Africa
- Azores triple junction – Tectonic plates intersection
- Banda Sea triple junction – Point where three tectonic plates meet
- Boso triple junction – Meeting point of the Okhotsk, Pacific, and Philippine Sea plates
- Bouvet triple junction – Meeting point of three tectonic plates
- Chile triple junction – Place where the South American, Nazca and Antarctic tectonic plates meet
- Fifteen-Twenty fracture zone – Fracture zone on the Mid-Atlantic Ridge
- Mount Fuji – Volcano in Japan
- Galapagos triple junction – Tectonic plate junction in the Pacific Ocean
- Iapetus Suture – Ancient geological fault
- Kamchatka-Aleutian triple junction – Place where the Pacific plate, the Okhotsk plate, and the North American plate meet
- Karlıova triple junction – Place where the Anatolian plate, the Eurasian plate and the Arabian plate meet
- Macquarie triple junction – Place where the Indo-Australian plate, Pacific plate, and Antarctic plate meet
- Mendocino triple junction – Point where the Gorda plate, the North American plate, and the Pacific plate meet
- Queen Charlotte triple junction – Point where the Pacific plate, the North American plate, and the Explorer plate meet
- Rivera triple junction – Place where the North American plate, the Rivera plate, and the Pacific plate meet
- Rodrigues triple junction – Place where the African plate, the Indo-Australian plate, and the Antarctic plate meet
- Tongareva triple junction – Defunct triple junction of the Pacific plate, the Farallon plate, and the Phoenix plate

== Other plate tectonics topics ==
- Computational Infrastructure for Geodynamics – Organization that advances Earth science
- Paleoclimatology – Study of changes in ancient climate
- Paleomap – Map of continents and mountain ranges in the past based on plate reconstructions
- Plate reconstruction – Process of reconstructing the positions of tectonic plates in the geological past
- Timeline of the development of tectonophysics (after 1952) – Chronological listing of significant events in the history of tectonophysics
- Timeline of the development of tectonophysics (before 1954) – Chronological listing of significant events in the history of tectonophysics
- Vine–Matthews–Morley hypothesis – Concept in plate tectonics
- Eclogitization – Tectonic process in which eclogite is formed

== Specific areas ==
(to be reallocated)

- Alpine Fault – Large geological fault in New Zealand
- Benham Rise, also known as Benham Plateau – Extinct volcanic ridge in the Philippine Sea
- Hawaiian–Emperor seamount chain – Pacific Ocean geologic feature
- Geology of the Alps
- Indian subcontinent – Physiographical region in South Asia
- Mariana Trench – Deepest oceanic trench on Earth
- Mid-Atlantic Ridge – Atlantic Ocean tectonic plate boundary
- Mohorovičić discontinuity – Boundary between the Earth's crust and the mantle
- Molucca Sea Collision Zone – Region of complex tectonic activity in Indonesia
- Pacific-Antarctic Ridge – Tectonic plate boundary in the South Pacific Ocean
- Philippine Mobile Belt – Tectonic boundary
- Ring of Fire – Tectonic belt of earthquakes and volcanoes
- San Andreas Fault – Geologic feature in California, United States
- Tethys Ocean, also known as Tethys Sea – Prehistoric ocean between Gondwana and Laurasia
