= Superocean =

Ocean that surrounds a supercontinent

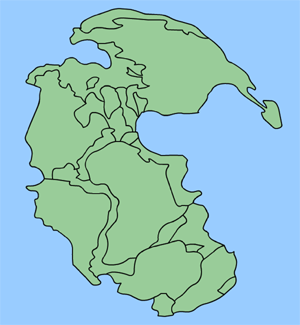
A paleomap showing the supercontinent Pangaea surrounded by the superocean Panthalassa.

A superocean is an ocean that surrounds a supercontinent. It is less commonly defined as any ocean larger than the current Pacific Ocean. Named global superoceans include Mirovia, which surrounded the supercontinent Rodinia, and Panthalassa, which surrounded the supercontinent Pangaea. Pannotia and Columbia, along with landmasses before Columbia (such as Ur and Kenorland), were also surrounded by superoceans.

As surface water moves unobstructed east to west in superoceans, it tends to warm from the exposure to sunlight so that the western edge of the ocean is warmer than the eastern. Additionally, seasonal changes in temperature, which would have been significantly more rapid inland, probably caused powerful monsoons. In general, however, the mechanics of superoceans are not well understood.

== List of superoceans ==
- Nealbara/Gyrosia (Vaalbara/Ur) (4.404–1.071 Ga)
- Lerova (Kenorland) (2.523–1.805 Ga)
- Atlanta-Pacifica Ocean (Atlic Ocean) (Columbia) (1.41–1.065 Ga)
- Mirovia (Rodinia) (1,380–600 Ma)
- Pan-African Ocean (Rodinia/Pannotia) (987.5-605 Ma)
- Panthalassa (Pannotia/Pangaea) (750–173 Ma)

=== Possible future superoceans ===
- Southern-Atlantic Ocean (Amasia)
- Atlantic Ocean (Novopangaea)
- Propanthalassic Ocean (Pangaea Proxima)
- Baikal Ocean (Pan-Asian Ocean) (Aurica)

== See also ==
- World Ocean
