= Pampean orogeny =

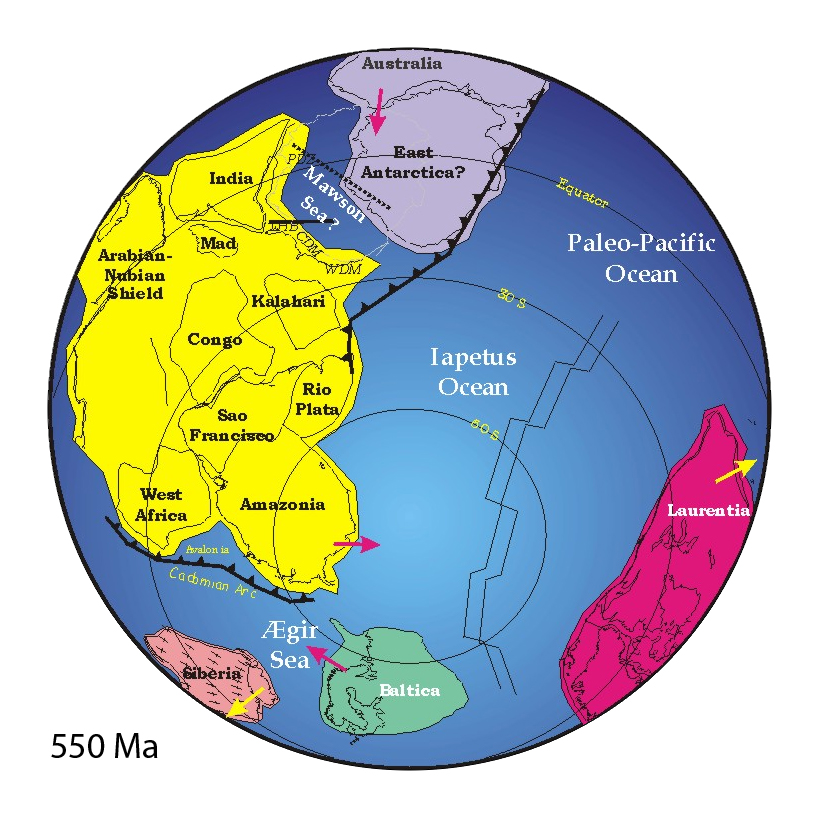
Paleogeographic reconstruction of Gondwana (in yellow) and Laurentia 550 million years ago during the time of the Pampean orogeny. The Pampean orogeny took place near the right border of the area marked as "Río Plata". Terranes and microcontinents such as Cuyania, Pampia and Chilenia are omitted.

The Pampean orogeny (Spanish: orogenia pampeana) was an orogeny active in the Cambrian in the western margin of the ancient landmass of Gondwana. The orogen's remains can now be observed in central Argentina, in particular at the Sierras de Córdoba (Note: The modern relief of Sierras de Córdoba is, however, related to the much more recent Andean orogeny in the Tertiary.) and other parts of the eastern (Note: All coordinates in this article are in relation to present-day geography and not to the past disposition of continents, terranes and oceans.) Sierras Pampeanas. It is uncertain if the orogeny involved at some point a continental collision. The Pampean orogen can be considered both part of the larger Terra Australis orogen and of the Brasiliano orogeny. The Pampean orogeny was succeeded by the Famatinian orogeny further west.

== Magmatic belts ==
The Pampean orogen contains a magmatic belt (Note: A magmatic belt is large-scale elongate arrays of igneous rock outcrops.) including granodiorites, monzogranites, and volcanic rocks, all of them of calc-alkaline chemistry. The igneous rocks of this belt formed at various times in over the period from 555 to 525 million years ago. From 525 million years ago onward another magmatic belt of peralumineous and mafic rocks developed further amidst gneiss, schist, amphibolites and carbonate rocks. The igneous rocks of this belt formed in the period from 525 to 515 million years ago.

Part of the pegmatite dykes of the Pampean Pegmatite Province formed during the orogeny. These dykes are thought to be derived from S-type granitic melts.

== Tectonic interpretation ==
The Pampean orogeny can be considered part of the larger Terra Australis orogeny or of the Brasiliano orogeny. The Pampean orogeny developed at a similar time as the Paraguai Belt of the Brasiliano Orogeny, but in difference to the Paraguay Belt that ended up in the interior of Gondwana the Pampean Orogen remained at a continental margin. The orogen eventually ceased activity and was succeeded by the Famatinian orogeny further west.

The eastern magmatic belt of the Pampean orogeny is interpreted as the remains of a volcanic arc associated with an east-dipping subduction zone while the western one is thought to represent a younger volcanic arc that developed on what was once the accretionary prism of the orogen.

There have been differing views among geologists on the tectonic and paleogeographic position of the Puncoviscana Basin in relation to the events of the Pampean orogeny. The Pampean orogeny is believed by some geologists to be associated with the accretion of a "Pampia Terrane" to the Río de la Plata Craton, resulting from the closure of a sea that existed in-between. This sea would have been the Puncoviscana Basin. Víctor Ramos proposes instead that the Puncoviscana Basin was a foreland basin located west of a "Pampia block" that collided with Río de la Plata Craton. Contrasting to this view Aceñolaza and Toselli claim instead that the Puncoviscana Basin originated from an aulacogen splitting Arequipa-Antofalla Craton from Río de la Plata and Guaporé Craton. Following this interpretation the aulacogen would have closed during the Pampean orogeny.
