= Pampia =

Ancient microcontinent or terrane

Pampia was an ancient microcontinent or terrane that collided with Río de la Plata Craton and Río Apas Craton during the Pampean orogeny of late Proterozoic and early Cambrian. It was one of the first terranes to be amalgamated to the old cratons of the east, and was followed by the suturing of Cuyania and Chilenia terranes into the young South American Plate.

== Sources ==
- The Andes - Tectonic Evolution
