= University of Tokushima =

Higher education institution in Tokushima Prefecture, Japan

Coordinates: 34.070°N 134.560°E

Tokushima University
- 徳島大学; Tokushima Daigaku
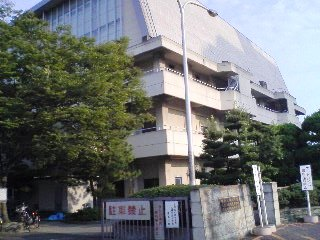
- Type: National
- Established: 1949
- Location: Tokushima, Tokushima, Japan
- Website: Official website

Tokushima University (徳島大学, Tokushima Daigaku) is a national university in the city of Tokushima, Japan, with seven graduate schools and five undergraduate faculties. The university was founded in 1949 by merging six national education facilities into one. The 2014 Nobel Prize Laureate in Physics, Shuji Nakamura, graduated from Tokushima University.

On April 1, 2015, the name of the university was changed from the University of Tokushima to Tokushima University.

== Overview ==
Tokushima University was first established in 1949 as a result of a merger of six schools, forming what are now the Faculty of Integrated Arts and Sciences, Faculty of Engineering and Faculty of Medicine. The university has 7,482 full time students and connections with more than 70 higher education institutions across Europe and Asia.

=== Organization and academics ===
Tokushima University is organized into seven graduate schools: School of Human and Natural Environment Sciences, School of Medical Sciences, School of Oral Sciences, School of Pharmaceutical Sciences, School of Nutrition and Bioscience, School of Health Sciences and School of Advanced Technology and Science. As for undergraduate faculties, there are Faculty of Integrated Arts and Sciences, Faculty of Medicine, Faculty of Dentistry, Faculty of Pharmaceutical Sciences and Faculty of Engineering.

Urologist Susumu Kagawa has been the president of the university since 2010.

=== Campuses ===
Tokushima University operates on three campuses: Shinkura (with the administrative head office), Jōsanjima, and Kuramoto.

== Notable alumni ==
- Shuji Nakamura, inventor of first high brightness GaN LED, awarded the 2014 Nobel Prize in Physics
- Shigenori Maruyama, Purple Honour Medal recipient for his work related to plume tectonics
