= Chiloé (disambiguation) =

Chiloé may refer to:

- Chiloé Archipelago in Chile
  - Chiloé Province, administrative division that covers most of the archipelago
    - Chiloé Island the main island of the archipelago, contained in the province
      - Chiloé National Park on the island
- Chiloé Block, a geological tectonic unit
- Chiloe Wigeon
