= San Juan Formation, Argentina =

Geologic formation in Argentina

San Juan Formation
- Stratigraphic range: Ordovician
- Type: Formation
- Overlies: La Silla Formation
- Thickness: 300–400 m (980–1,310 ft)

Lithology
- Primary: Limestone, marl
- Other: Mudstone

Location
- Coordinates: 30.3°S 68.2°W
- Approximate paleocoordinates: 35.4°S 132.8°W
- Region: San Juan Province
- Country: Argentina
- Extent: Precordillera

Type section
- Named for: San Juan Province
- San Juan Formation, Argentina (Argentina)

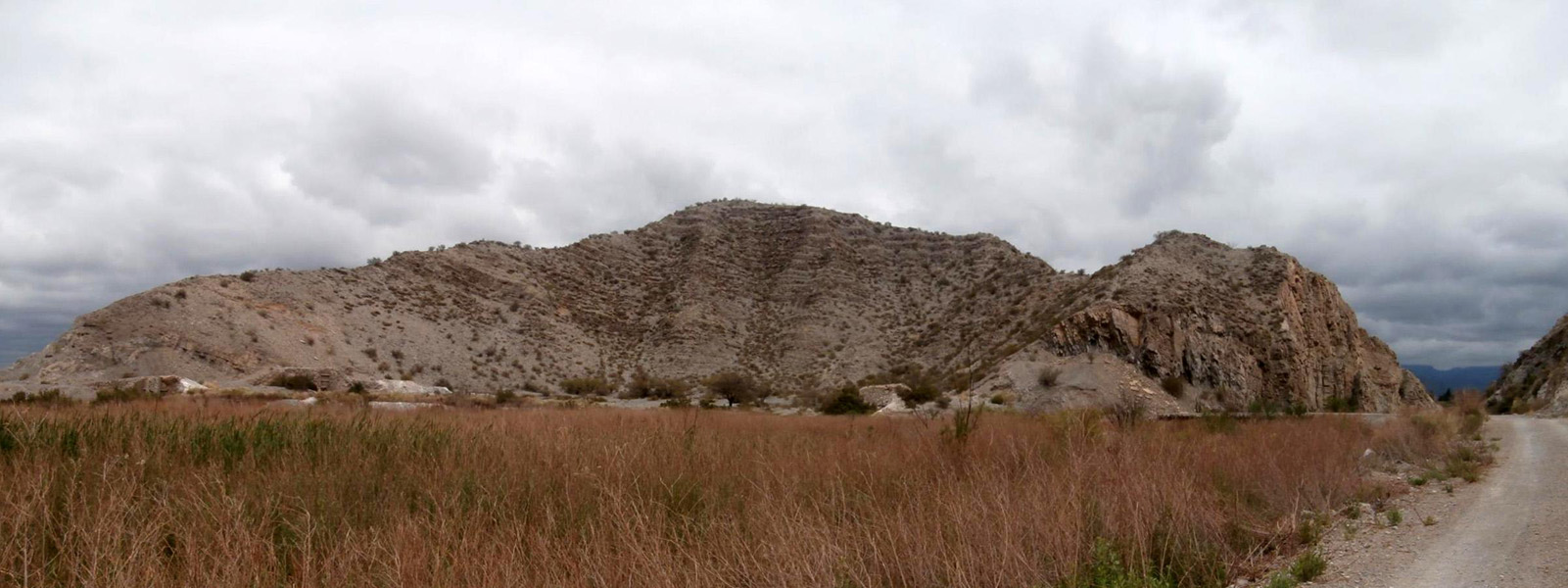

The San Juan Formation (Spanish: Formación San Juan) is a geologic formation in Argentina. The formation comprising limestones, mudstones and marls was deposited in a shallow marine reefal environment and preserves many fossils dating back to the Ordovician period. The formation overlies the La Silla Formation and crops out in the Precordillera of San Juan Province.

The oldest calcareous microfossils, known as calcispheres or calcitarchs, were found in the Early Ordovician (Floian) strata of this formation. Trilobites, gastropods and echinoderm Nuia sibiria have been collected from the same deposits.

== See also ==
- Geological history of the Precordillera terrane
- Mesón Group
