= Neoarchean =

Fourth era of the Archean Eon

- 2800 – 2500 Ma
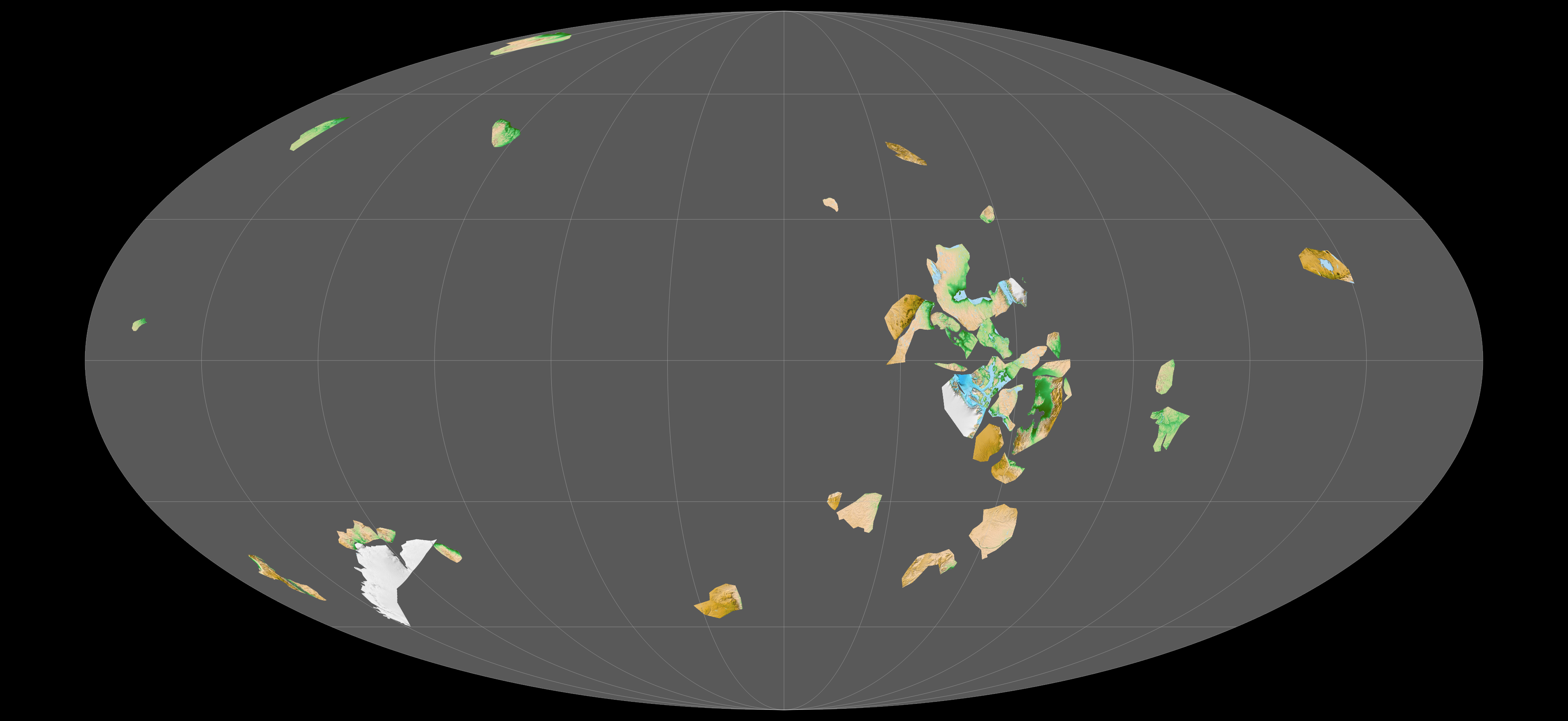
- A reconstruction of the Earth's continents during the middle Neoarchean, c. 2.65 Ga.

Chronology
← / Prokaryotic Microbes appeared on land; ← / Supercontinent Kenorland forms; ← / Thuchomyces evolves, earliest macroscopic land life
Events of the Neoarchean Era; Vertical axis scale: Millions of years ago
- Proposed redefinition(s): 2780–2420 Ma; Gradstein et al., 2012
- Proposed subdivisions: Methanian Period, 2780–2630 Ma Gradstein et al., 2012; Siderian Period, 2630–2420 Gradstein et al., 2012

Etymology
- Name formality: Formal
- Alternate spelling(s): Neoarchaean

Usage information
- Celestial body: Earth
- Regional usage: Global (ICS)
- Time scale(s) used: ICS Time Scale

Definition
- Chronological unit: Era
- Stratigraphic unit: Erathem
- Time span formality: Formal
- Lower boundary definition: Defined Chronometrically
- Lower GSSA ratified: Not formally defined
- Upper boundary definition: Defined Chronometrically
- Upper GSSA ratified: 1990

The Neoarchean (/ˌniːoʊ.ɑːrˈkiːən/ NEE-oh-ar-KEE-ən; also spelled Neoarchaean) is the last geologic era in the Archean Eon that spans from 2800 to 2500 million years ago—the period being defined chronometrically and not referencing a specific level in a rock section on Earth. The era is marked by major developments in complex life and continental formation.

== Complex life ==
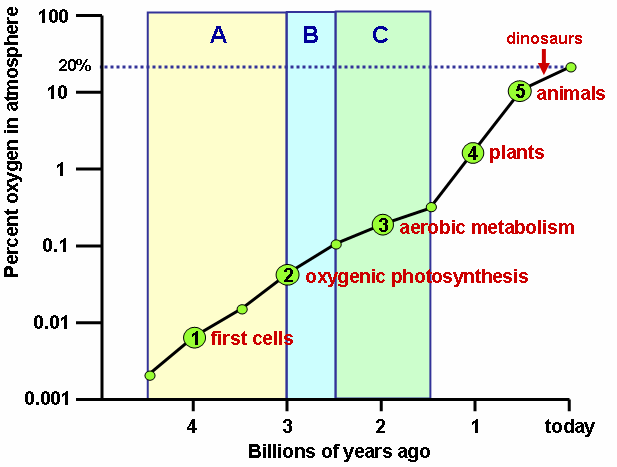
Semi-logarithmic graph showing the increase of oxygen in Earth's atmosphere through Earth's geological history

This era saw the rise of oxygen in the atmosphere after oxygenic photosynthesis evolved in cyanobacteria as early as the Mesoarchean era. The environmental changes that occurred in the Neoarchean such as its developing atmospheric and soil compositions drastically differentiated the era from others in its encouragement of microbial metabolisms to evolve and diversify. The era could have also seen pre-biotic organic molecules being brought to Earth through meteorites, comets, or through abiotic reactions. The growth of juvenile continental crust as well as the onset of plate tectonics in the Archean allowed for the colonization of a larger variety of niches by microorganisms through increasing the number of rock types present and thereby increasing the surface's chemical diversity. Some noted metabolisms were able to flourish due to changes in the availability of certain metals while others faced famine: an increase in copper present in the environment in the Neoarchean likely favored aerobic metabolisms.

Oxygenic photosynthesis may have been limited earlier in the Archean era from a lack of phosphorus stemming from poor biological recycling in anaerobic conditions. This issue was alleviated in the Neoarchean with the abundance of phosphorus in magmatic rocks, which when combined with other evolving geodynamics such as increasing organic matter burial and higher oxidative states in volcanic sulfur and magmatic iron contributed to a large buildup of oxygen in the atmosphere, leading to the Great Oxidation Event in the Paleoproterozoic era.

The earliest evidence of microbial oxidation of sulphur, dating to approximately 2.52 Ga, comes from the Gamohaan Formation of South Africa, revealing that sulphur-oxidising bacteria had evolved prior to the Great Oxidation Event.

The earliest potential eukaryote fossils come from Neoarchaean deposits in South Africa dating to 2.8 to 2.7 Ga, resembling present day siphonalean microalgae. However, the identity of these microfossils as eukaryotes is highly controversial and remains disputed.

== Continental formation ==
During this era, the supercontinent Kenorland is proposed to have formed about 2.7 billion years ago. Kenorland is of particular interest due to it containing deposits of volcanic-hosted massive sulphide, gold, and uranium found in the Canadian Shield. With new research, the validity of Kenorland has been questioned in favor of other Neoarchean supercontinent proposals Superia or Vaalbara. Improved geologic knowledge suggests that a part of Kenorland, specifically the Churchill Province, was instead a continental development that formed after the Neoarchean era, Nuna, closer to 1.9 billion years ago. This challenge to the reconstruction is based on research studying northern Kenorland's Paleoproterozoic cover as well as the suture between the Rae and Hearne cratons.

The supercontinent cycle can be studied through patterns that describe how Earth's crust and its mineral deposits were preserved over time since Pangaea. Plate tectonics, having developed earlier in the Archean eon, produced the force necessary for metamorphism and magmatic activity which greatly contributed to these continental changes. Research on how the supercontinents broke apart and combined into different configurations is involved in linking together deep-interior and surface-level processes as well as the assessment of contrasting models of early Paleoproterozoic geodynamic activity.

== See also ==
- Huronian glaciation
