= Susumu Kagawa =

Japanese urologist (1944–2021)

Susumu Kagawa (香川 征, Kagawa Susumu, 1944 – 7 April 2021) was a Japanese urologist and a co-author of 41 peer-reviewed articles all of which can be found on Web of Science and PubMed. He was also a President of the University of Tokushima.
