= Pan-African Ocean =

Hypothesized paleo-ocean whose closure created the supercontinent of Pannotia

The Pan-African Ocean is a hypothesized paleo-ocean whose closure created the supercontinent of Pannotia. The ocean may have existed before the break-up of the supercontinent of Rodinia. The ocean closed before the beginning of the Phanerozoic Eon, when the Panthalassa ocean expanded, and was eventually replaced by it.

== See also ==
- Mirovia – Hypothesized superocean surrounding the supercontinent Rodinia in the Neoproterozoic Era
- Pan-African orogeny – Series of major mountain-forming events in the Neoproterozoic
