= Vaalbara =

Hypothetical Archaean supercontinent from about 3.6 to 2.7 billion years ago

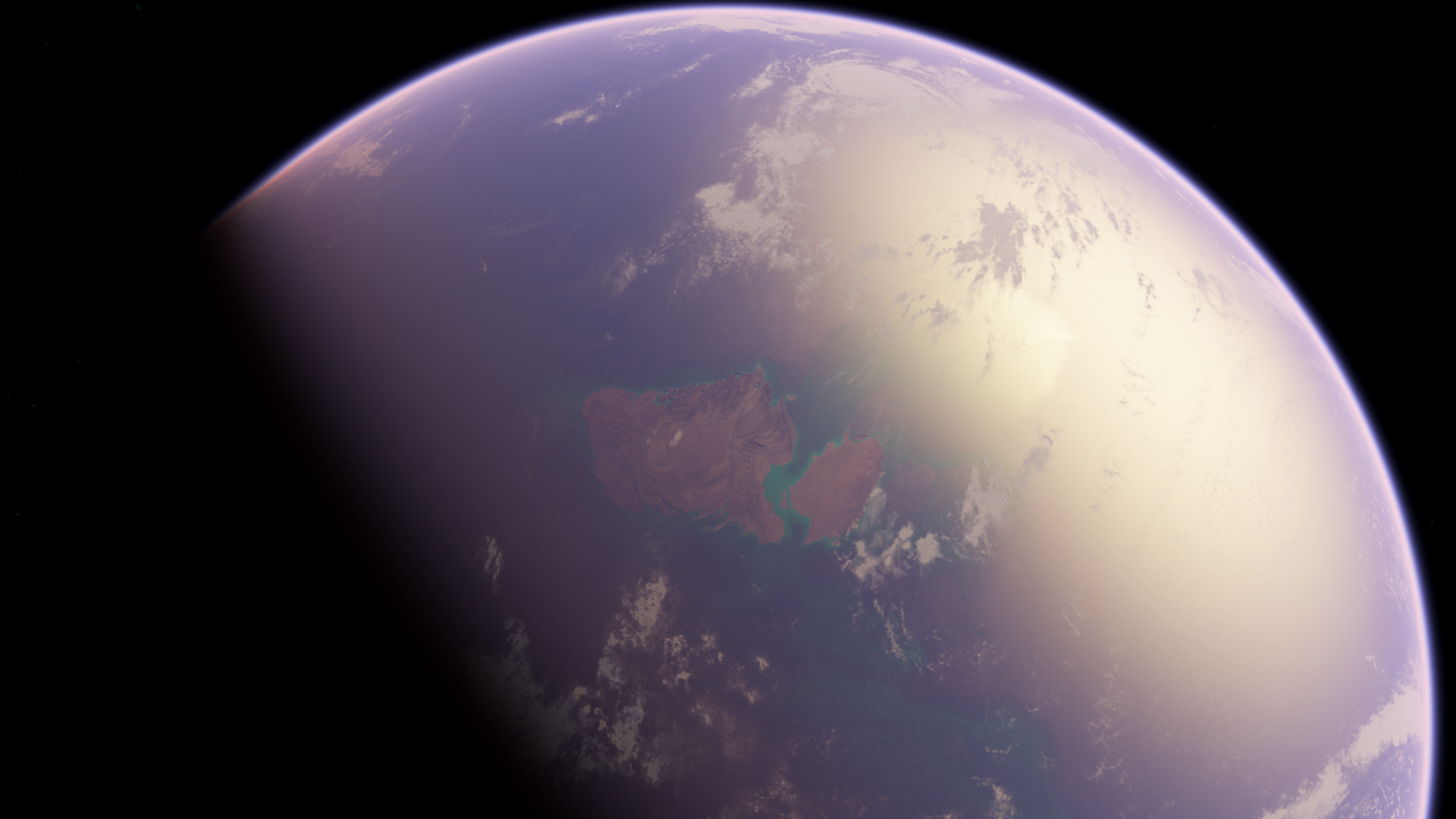
- A reconstruction of Vaalbara

Historical continent
- Formed: 3.6 Ga
- Type: Supercontinent
- Today part of: Kaapvaal Craton; Pilbara Craton; Grunehogna Craton

Vaalbara today
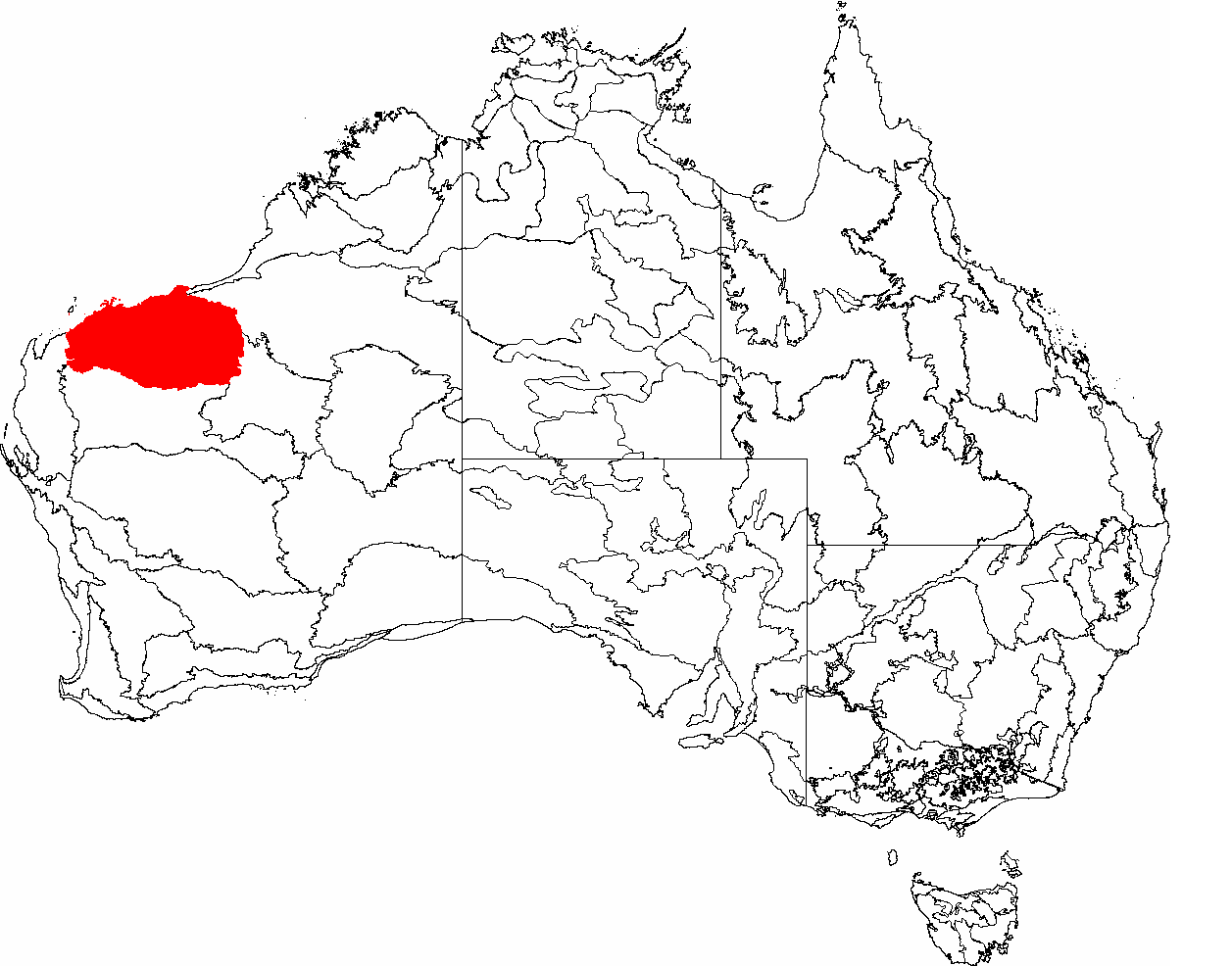
Current locations of Kaapvaal and Pilbara cratons

Vaalbara is a hypothetical Archean supercontinent consisting of the Kaapvaal Craton (in present-day eastern South Africa) and the Pilbara Craton (in present-day north-western Western Australia). E. S. Cheney derived the name from the last four letters of each craton's name. The two cratons consist of continental crust dating from 3.6 to 2.7 Ga; this timing would make Vaalbara one of Earth's earliest supercontinents.

== Existence and lifespan ==
There has been some debate as to when and even if Vaalbara existed. An Archaean–Palaeoproterozoic (2.8–2.1 Ga) link between South Africa and Western Australia was first proposed by Alan Button in 1976. He found a wide range of similarities between the Transvaal Basin in South Africa and the Hamersley Basin in Australia.

Button, however, placed Madagascar between Africa and Australia and concluded that Gondwana must have had a long stable tectonic history. Similarly, in the reconstruction of Rogers 1993, 1996 the oldest continent is Ur. In Rogers' reconstructions, however, Kaapvaal and Pilbara are placed far apart already in their Gondwana configuration, a reconstruction contradicted by later orogenic events and incompatible with the Vaalbara hypothesis.

Cheney 1996, nevertheless, found a three-fold stratigraphic similarity and proposed that the two cratons once formed a continent which he named Vaalbara. This model is supported by the palaeomagnetic data of Zegers, de Wit & White 1998. Reconstructions of the palaeolatitudes of the two cratons at 2.78–2.77 Ga are ambiguous however. In the reconstruction of Wingate 1998 they fail to overlap, but they do in more recent reconstructions, for example Strik et al. 2003.

Other scientists dispute the existence of Vaalbara and explain similarities between the two cratons as the product of global processes. They point, for example, to thick volcanic deposits on other cratons such as Amazonia, São Francisco, and Karnataka.

Zimgarn, another proposed supercraton composed of the Zimbabwe and Yilgarn cratons at 2.41 Ga, is distinct from Vaalbara. Zimgarn should have disintegrated around 2.1–2.0 Ga to reassemble as the Kalahari and West Australian (Yilgarn and Pilbara) cratons around 1.95–1.8 Ga.

The Archaean–Palaeoproterozoic Grunehogna Craton in Queen Maud Land, East Antarctica, formed the eastern part of the Kalahari Craton for at least a billion years. Grunehogna collided with the rest of East Antarctica during the Mesoproterozoic assembly of the supercontinent Rodinia and the Grenville orogeny. The Neoproterozoic Pan-African orogeny and the assembly of Gondwana/Pannotia produced large shear zones between Grunehogna and Kalahari. During the Jurassic break-up of Gondwana, these shear zones finally separated Grunehogna and the rest of Antarctica from Africa. In the Annandags Peaks in Antarctica, the only exposed parts of Grunehogna, detrital zircons from several crustal sources have been dated to 3.9–3.0 Ga suggesting intracrustal recycling was an important part in the formation of the first cratons.

The Kaapvaal craton is marked by dramatic events such as the intrusion of the Bushveld Complex (2.045 Ga) and the Vredefort impact event (2.025 Ga), and no traces of these events have been found in the Pilbara craton, clearly indicating that the two cratons were separated before 2.05 Ga. Furthermore, geochronological and palaeomagnetic evidence show that the two cratons had a rotational 30° latitudinal separation in the time period of 2.78–2.77 Ga, which indicates they were no longer joined after c. 2.8 billion years ago.

Vaalbara thus remained stable for 1–0.4 Ga and hence had a life span similar to that of later supercontinents such as Gondwana and Rodinia. Some palaeomagnetic reconstructions suggest a Palaeoarchaean proto-Vaalbara is possible, although the existence of this 3.6–3.2 Ga continent cannot be proven.

== Evidence ==
South Africa's Kaapvaal craton and Western Australia's Pilbara craton have similar early Precambrian cover sequences. Kaapvaal's Barberton granite-greenstone terrane and Pilbara's eastern block show evidence of four large meteorite impacts between 3.2 and 3.5 billion years ago. Similar greenstone belts are found at the margins of the Superior Craton of Canada.

The high temperatures created by the impacts' forces fused sediments into small glassy spherules. Spherules of 3.5 billion years old exist in South Africa, and spherules of a similar age have been found in Western Australia; they are the oldest-known terrestrial impact products. The spherules resemble the glassy chondrules (rounded granules) in carbonaceous chondrites, which are found in carbon-rich meteorites and lunar soils.

Remarkably similar lithostratigraphic and chronostratigraphic structural sequences between these two cratons have been noted for the period between 3.5 and 2.7 Ga. Paleomagnetic data from two ultramafic complexes in the cratons showed that at 3.87 Ga the two cratons could have been part of the same supercontinent. Both the Pilbara and Kaapvaal cratons show extensional faults which were active about 3.47 Ga during felsic volcanism and coeval with the impact layers.

== Origin of life ==
The Pilbara and Kaapvaal cratons contain well-preserved Archaean microfossils. Drilling has revealed traces of microbial life and photosynthesis from the Archaean in both Africa and Australia. The oldest widely accepted evidence of photosynthesis by early life forms is molecular fossils found in 2.7 Ga-old shales in the Pilbara Craton. These fossils have been interpreted as traces of eukaryotes and cyanobacteria, though some scientists argue that these biomarkers must have entered these rocks later and date the fossils to 2.15–1.68 Ga. This later time span agrees with estimates based on molecular clocks which dates the eukaryote last common ancestor at 1.8–1.7 Ga. If the Pilbara fossils are traces of early eukaryotes, they could represent groups that went extinct before modern groups emerged.

== See also ==
- List of shields and cratons
- Continent
- Timeline of natural history
- History of the Earth
- Geological history of Earth
