= Boso triple junction =

Meeting point of the Okhotsk, Pacific, and Philippine Sea plates

Tectonic plates under Japan North American plate Pacific plate Philippine Sea plate Eurasian plate Boso triple junction

The Boso triple junction (also known as off-Boso triple junction) is a triple junction off the coast of Japan; it is one of two known examples of a trench-trench-trench triple junction on the Earth (the other being the Banda Sea triple junction). It is the meeting point of the North American plate (represented by the Okhotsk plate) to the north, the Pacific plate to the east and the Philippine Sea plate to the south.

== Name origin ==
The Boso triple junction is named after the Bōsō Peninsula.

== Formation ==
It is formed from the junction of the Izu–Bonin–Mariana Arc where the Izu–Bonin Trench meets with the Japan Trench and the Sagami Trench.

== Risks ==
Located some 300 kilometres (190 mi) from the Boso triple junction, Tokyo is subject to quakes and tsunamis generated from slips along this junction. Furthermore, there is a large populated region along the coast of the main island that would also be subject to damage. This junction probably has the highest associated insurance risk in the world, due to its proximity to extensive urban development.

The Boso triple junction is only ~400 kilometers from the Mount Fuji triple junction.

The 2011 Tōhoku earthquake and tsunami were generated along the Japan trench well to the north of the junction and did not involve the other two trenches, although quakes that may have been aftershocks have been observed there.
