= Annandags Peaks =

Mountains in Antarctica

The Annandags Peaks (72°32′S 6°18′W) are a group of small, isolated peaks about 15 nautical miles (30 km) southwest of the Jule Peaks (Christmas Peaks) in Queen Maud Land. They were mapped by Norwegian cartographers from surveys and from air photos by the Norwegian–British–Swedish Antarctic Expedition (1949–52) and named "Annandagstoppane" (Boxing Day's Peaks).

The Annadagstoppane granite is the only exposed part of the Archaean basement of the Grunehogna Craton and the only Archaean fragment of West Gondwana (Africa and South America) left in Antarctica. U-Pb dating of the youngest detrital zircons from Annandagstoppane returned an age of 3067±8 Ma and a tectonic-magmatic history identical to that of the Kaapvaal craton in southern Africa. This suggests that the Kaapvaal-Grunehogna Craton remained stable for 2.5 billion years before it was split by the Pan-African orogeny. Hafnium dating of phenocrystic and detrital zircons in the granite revealed several crustal sources up to 3.9 billion years old. This suggests that intracrustal melting and recycling was common in the Mesoarchaean and may be an important process in the initial stabilisation of continental crust (i.e. the formation of the first cratons.)
