= Precordillera =

Spanish geographical term

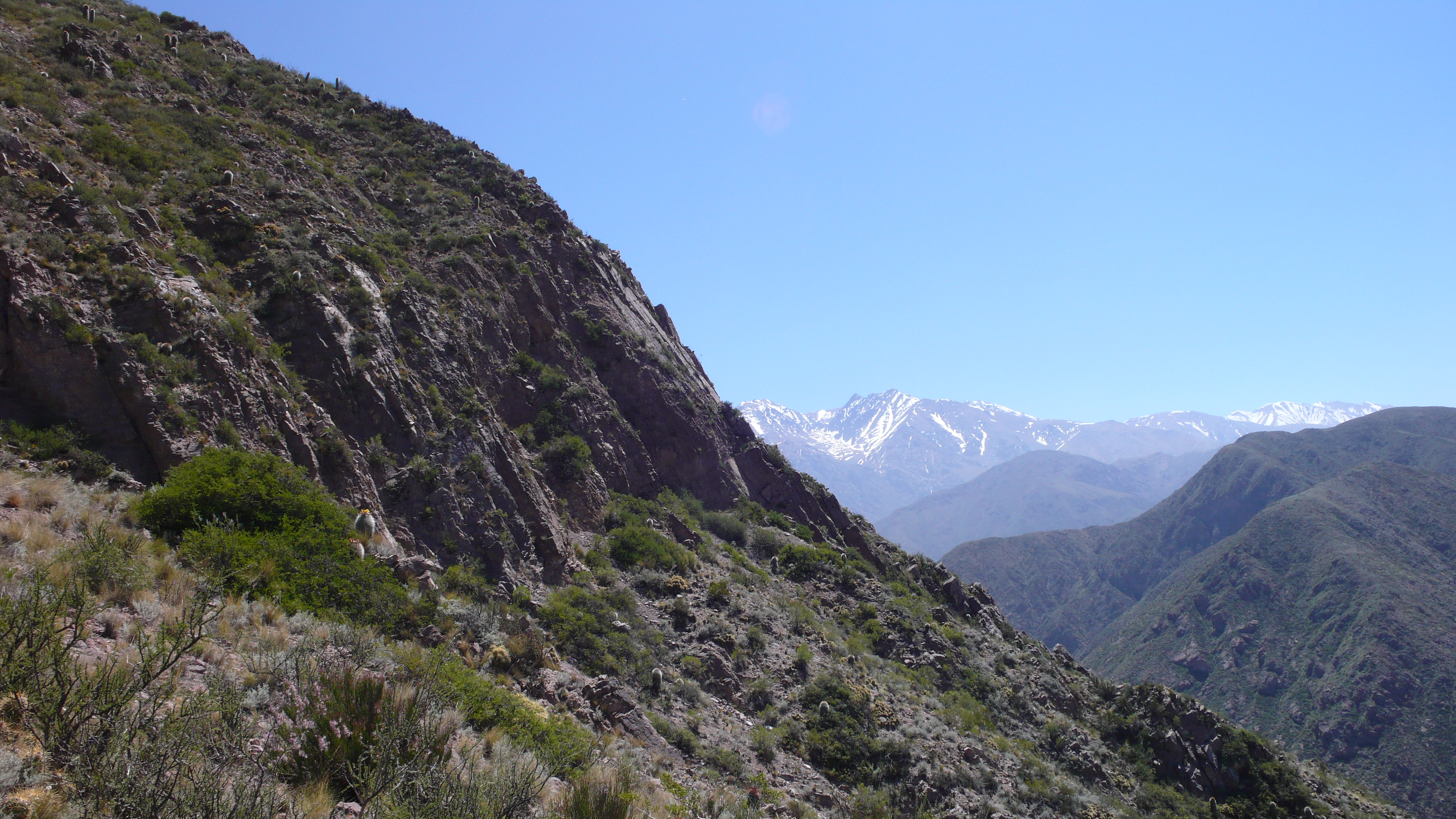
Precordillera, Province of Mendoza, Argentina

Precordillera is a Spanish geographical term for hills and mountains lying before a greater range, similar to foothills. The term is derived from cordillera (mountain range)—literally "pre-mountain range"—and applied usually to the Andes.

Some places usually called precordillera are:

- Andean mountains east of the main ranges of Andes in Argentina. It is separated from the much higher Frontal Cordillera to the west by Uspallata Valley in Argentina. Precordillera mountains reach around 3,000 m a.s.l. in Sierras de Villavicencio.
- Used all over Chile from north to south as a morphological unit lying just between the Andes and the Intermediate Depression.

== See also ==
- Geological history of the precordillera terrane
- Cuyania – Ancient microcontinent now part of Argentina
