= Jule Peaks =

The Jule Peaks (72°23′S 5°33′W) are a small group of isolated peaks located about 35 nautical miles (65 km) west-northwest of Borg Mountain in Queen Maud Land, Antarctica. They were mapped by Norwegian cartographers from surveys and air photos by the Norwegian–British–Swedish Antarctic Expedition (1949–1952), and named Juletoppane (the Christmas peaks). The Annandags Peaks sit about 15 nautical miles (30 km) southwest.
