= Ur (continent) =

Hypothetical Archaean supercontinent from about 3.1 billion years ago

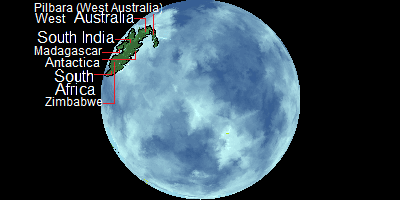
- Ur, in hypothetical reconstruction during the Eoarchean Era

Historical continent
- Formed: 3.1 Ga
- Type: Supercontinent
- Today part of: Pilbara Craton; Dharwar Craton; Singhbhum Craton; Kaapvaal craton; Zimbabwe Craton

Ur is a hypothetical supercontinent that formed in the Archean eon around 3.1 billion years ago (Ga). In a reconstruction by Rogers, Ur is half a billion years older than Arctica and, in the early period of its existence, probably the only continent on Earth, making it a supercontinent despite probably being smaller than present-day Australia. In more recent works geologists often refer to both Ur and other proposed Archaean continental assemblages as supercratons. Ur can, nevertheless, be half a billion years younger than Vaalbara, but the concepts of these two early cratonic assemblages are compatible, in some forms.

== Mostly incompatible reconstructions ==
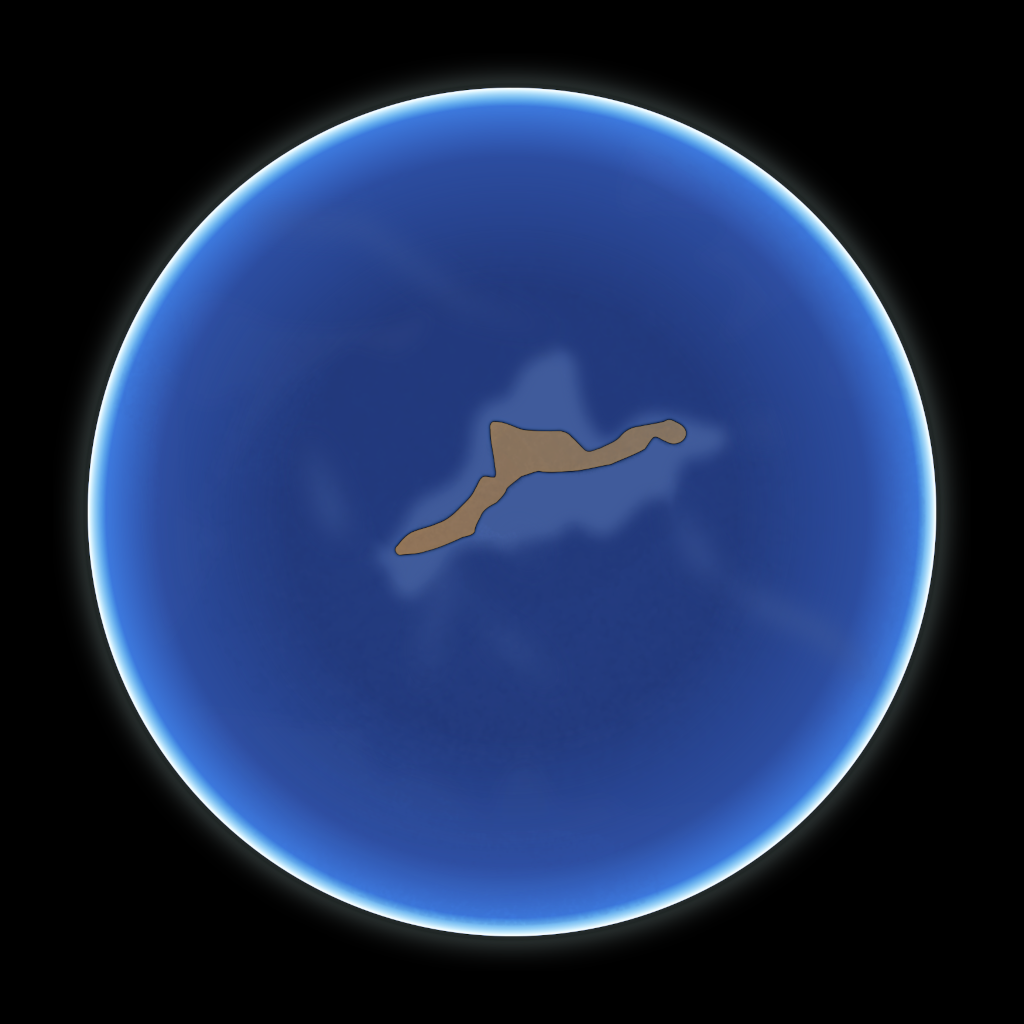
Artistic depiction of Ur

About 1.3–1.1 Ga, Ur joined the continents Nena and Atlantica to form the supercontinent Rodinia. In the reconstruction of Rogers 1996, Ur remained the nucleus of eastern Gondwana until the break-up of Gondwana. In other reconstructions, however, India and East Antarctica did not collide until Rodinia formed 1.1 Ga. Furthermore, in the early Archaean Earth's mantle was 200 °C (360 °F) hotter than today, and many characteristics of modern tectonics, such as ophiolites, blueschists, lawsonite-bearing eclogites, and ultra-high-pressure rocks, did not exist or were rare. This makes most proposed Archaean supercontinents controversial, including Rogers's 3 Ga supercontinent.

Reconstructions of Vaalbara place two cratons—Kaapvaal in southern Africa and Pilbara in western Australia—next to each other based on stratigraphic similarities. In Roger's configuration of Ur, these cratons are placed far apart in their Gondwana configuration. This configuration is contradicted by widespread Precambrian collisional events between Australia and Africa. This is why these are mostly incompatible, but the YouTuber Algol managed to do this by pushing Kaapvaal and Pilbara away.

Another possible supercraton, Zimgarn, proposed by Smirnov et al. 2013 and named after the Zimbabwe and Yilgarn cratons, is distinct from both Vaalbara and Ur. Vaalbara and Zimgarn, according to this proposal, both disintegrated about 2.1–2.0 Ga to reassemble as the Kalahari and West Australian cratons 2.5–1.5 Ga. Smirnov et al. based this reconstruction on: (1) Zimgarn was still undergoing cratonisation when an extensive carbonate platform developed over Vaalbara; (2) the magmatic signatures are different for the two supercratons during the period 2.6–2.0 Ga; and (3) paleomagnetic latitudes for 2.7 Ga are slightly different.

== Original concept and later interpretations ==
Important geological similarities link now remote Archaean cratons in India (Singhbhum and Dharwar), western Australia (Kilbaran and Pilbara), and southern Africa (Kaapvaal and Zimbabwe) which indicate that these protolithic shields were close together in the mid-Archaean. The name "Ur", from the German prefix ur- meaning "original", was introduced by Rogers 1993, since it is the first continent in his tectonic reconstructions. Other Archaean continental assemblages are considerably younger: Arctica (Baltica, Laurentia, Ur, and Siberia) consolidated around 2.6 Ga, Atlantica (West Africa and eastern South America) consolidated around 2.1 Ga. In some reconstructions the shields of Ur stayed near each other until the Mesozoic break-up of Gondwana.

Conjectured map of Ur and succeeding landmasses

The cratons that had become stable around 3 Ga were all in the same region within Pangaea, which is the main argument for them having formed a single continent 3 Ga. The Kaapvaal craton became stable around 3.1 Ga. The Pilbara Craton is not well defined but formed around 3 Ga. Three cratons in East Antarctica are of similar age but not well known. These cratons share similar geological histories and are therefore assumed to have formed Vaalbara.

Three small areas in the Indian Ocean coast of Antarctica are also about 3 Ga old: western Queen Maud Land, the Napier complex, and the Vestfold Hills. Within Gondwana, these areas were in a belt of Grenville-age deformation, and because there is no evidence of ocean closure in this belt (except in Africa), the 1 Ga orogen can be assumed to be intra-continental. Consequently, the southern margin of Ur is now below the Antarctic ice cover.

Two cratons in India of equal age, Western Dharwar and Singhbhum, were also part of Ur. Two other Indian cratons, Eastern Dharwar and Bhandara, also formed around 3 Ga but underwent extensive magmatism around 2.5 Ga not seen elsewhere, and their relation to Ur is unclear. Ur, nevertheless, became larger around 2.5 Ga, and this so-called "Expanded Ur" incorporated the Zimbabwe and Yilgarn cratons.

The largest preserved parts of Ur are in India: Aravalli, Dharwar, Bundelkhand, and Singhbhum. The Central Indian Tectonic Zone is the modern suture between the Bundelkhand-Aravalli block and the other Archaean blocks. 2.8–2.6 Ga metamorphism in Dharwar and Bundelkhand indicate that the stabilisation of Ur probably continued until the end of that period.
