= Vulcan structure =

Tectonic boundary in North America

The Vulcan structure is a 350-kilometre (220 mi) long major convergent boundary between the Medicine Hat Block and the Loverna Block, Archean basement rock structures which lie between the Wyoming craton and Hearne craton on the western edge of the North American craton. It lies under the Western Canadian Sedimentary Basin.

The Vulcan structure has intrigued geologists because it is a region of low gravity and contains an east-trending magnetic anomaly which cuts across the magnetic field of southern Alberta at a high angle. The Vulcan structure was the target of one of the first deep-crustal seismic profiles in the late 1960s. Geologists have offered several explanations for what the structure is. This includes a failed Proterozoic rift, an intraplate collision zone, a Proterozoic suture, or a continental collision zone.
