= Kamchatka–Aleutian triple junction =

Place where the Pacific plate, the Okhotsk plate, and the North American plate meet

Coordinates: 56.2°N 163.5°E

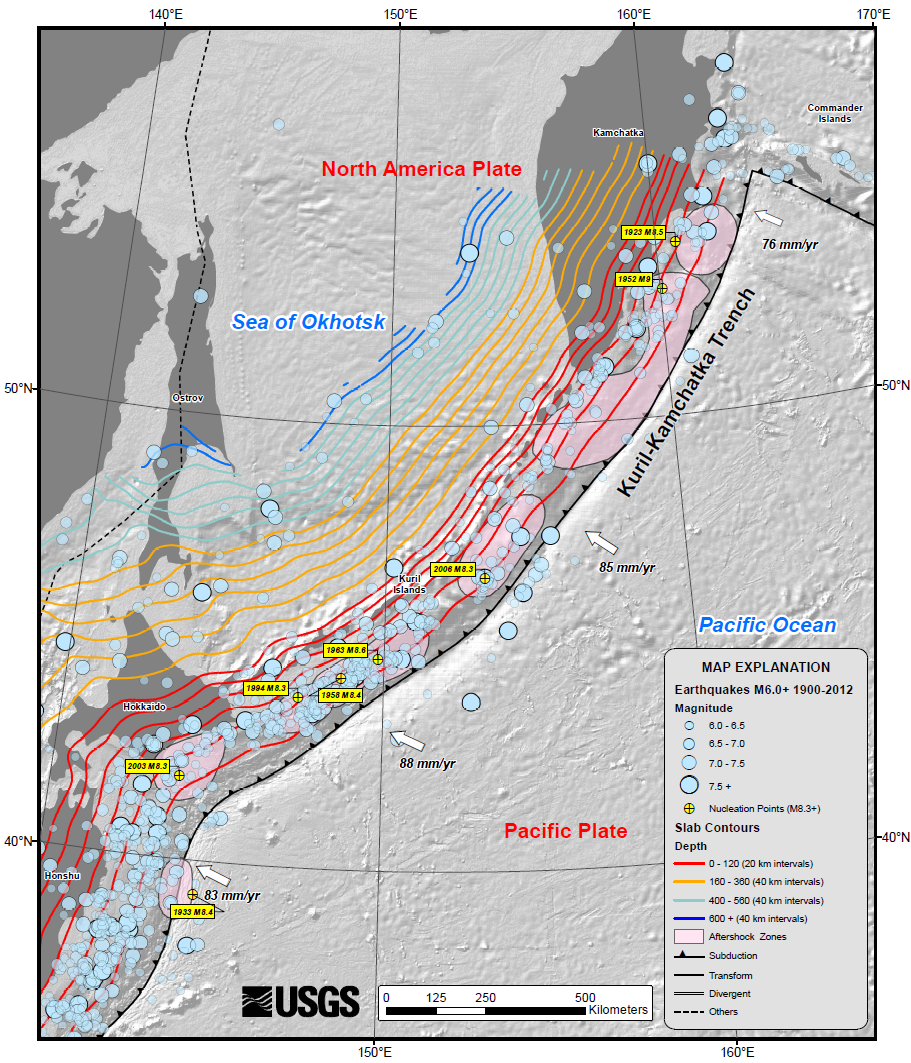
The Kamchatka–Aleutian junction is located at the northern end of the Kuril–Kamchatka Trench.

The Kamchatka–Aleutian triple junction is a triple junction of tectonic plates, of the fault–fault–trench type, where the Pacific plate, the Okhotsk plate, and the North American plate meet. It is located east of the Kamchatka Mys peninsula and west of Bering Island. Meiji Seamount is located to the southeast of the junction.

In the Kamchatka–Aleutian junction, the Kuril–Kamchatka Trench meets the Aleutian Trench. The former is a subduction zone while the latter is a transform fault in its western part.
