= Chiloé Block =

Tectonic unit under Chile

The Chiloé Block or Chiloé Terrane is a geotectonic unit making up the basement of large parts of south-central Chile between 41° and 45°S. Due to its form, it is sometimes called Chiloé Sliver. The Chiloé Block is believed to be an ancient microcontinent or terrane that collided with the South American Plate during the Proterozoic. The Chiloé Sliver is however badly sutured to South America as the Liquiñe-Ofqui Fault runs through its eastern boundary.
