= Pannotia =

Hypothesized Neoproterozoic supercontinent

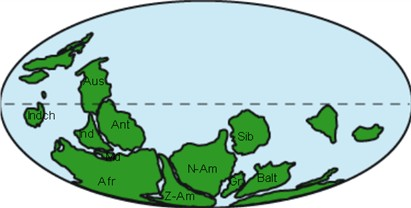
Pannotia was centred on the South Pole, hence its name.

Pannotia (from Greek: pan-, "all", -nótos, "south"; meaning "all southern land"), also known as the Vendian supercontinent, Greater Gondwana, and the Pan-African supercontinent, is a proposed relatively short-lived Neoproterozoic supercontinent that may have formed at the end of the Precambrian during the Pan-African orogeny (650–500 Ma), during the Cryogenian period, and broke apart 560 Ma with the opening of the Iapetus Ocean, in the late Ediacaran and early Cambrian. Pannotia formed when Laurentia was located adjacent to the two major South American cratons, Amazonia and Río de la Plata. The opening of the Iapetus Ocean separated Laurentia from Baltica, Amazonia, and Río de la Plata. A 2022 paper argues that Pannotia never fully existed, reinterpreting the geochronological evidence: "the supposed landmass had begun to break up well before it was fully assembled". However, the assembly of the next supercontinent Pangaea is well established.

== Origin of concept ==
J. D. A. Piper was probably the first to propose a Proterozoic supercontinent preceding Pangaea, today known as Rodinia. At that time he simply referred to it as "the Proterozoic super-continent", but much later he named this "symmetrical crescent-shaped analogue of Pangaea" 'Palaeopangaea' and in 2000 he still insisted that there is neither a need nor any evidences for Rodinia or its daughter supercontinent Pannotia or a series of other proposed supercontinents since Archaean times.

The existence of a late Proterozoic supercontinent, much different from Pangaea, was first proposed by McWilliams 1981 based on paleomagnetic data, and the break-up of this supercontinent around 625–550 Ma was documented by Bond, Nickeson & Kominz 1984. The reconstruction of Bond et al. is virtually identical to that of Dalziel 1997 and others.

Another term for the supercontinent that is thought to have existed at the end of Neoproterozoic time is "Greater Gondwanaland", suggested by Stern 1994. This term recognizes that the supercontinent of Gondwana, which formed at the end of the Neoproterozoic, was once part of the much larger Neoproterozoic supercontinent.

Pannotia was named by Powell 1995, based on the term "Pannotios" originally proposed by Stump 1987 for "the cycle of tectonic activity common to the Gondwana continents that resulted in the formation of the supercontinent." Young 1995 proposed renaming the older Proterozoic supercontinent (now known as Rodinia) "Kanatia", the St. Lawrence Iroquoian word from which the name Canada is derived, while keeping the name Rodinia for the latter Neoproterozoic supercontinent (now known as Pannotia). Powell, however, objected to this renaming and instead proposed Stump's term for the latter supercontinent.

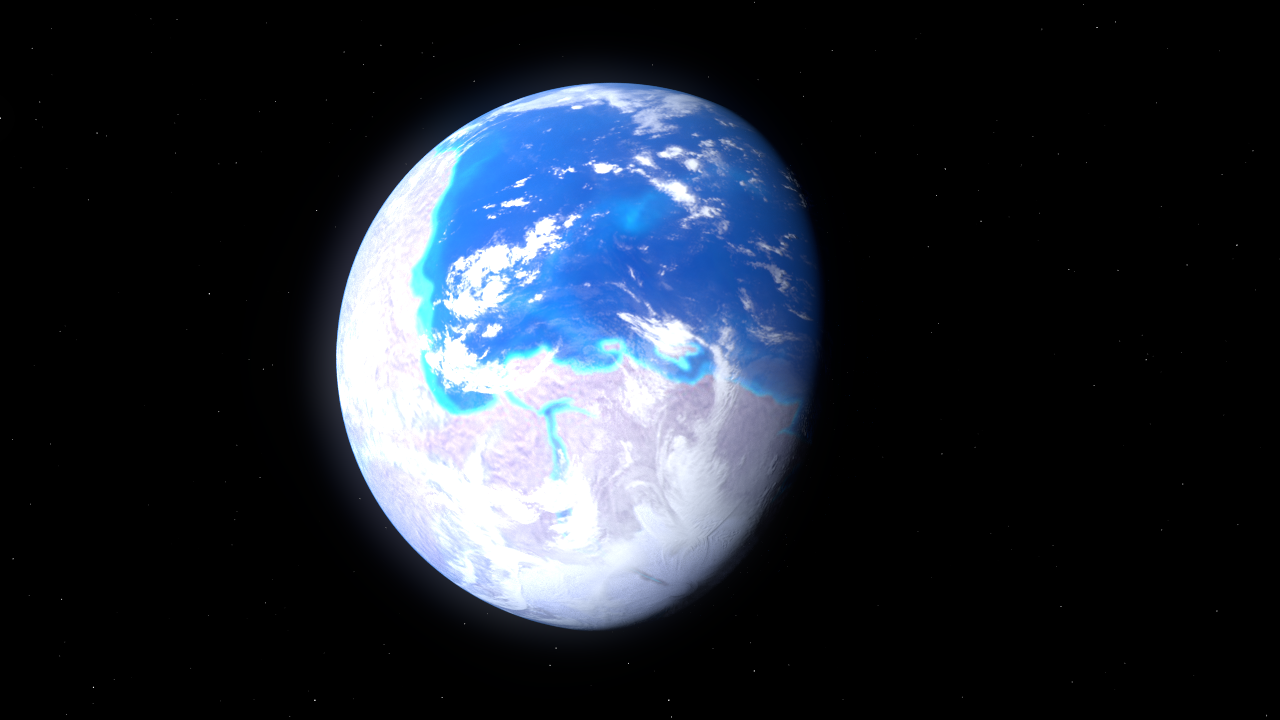
An artist's impression of Pannotia, about 600 million years ago, in the Ediacaran period

== Formation ==
Pannotia 545 Ma, view centred on the South Pole, after Dalziel 1997

The formation of Pannotia began during the Pan-African orogeny when the Congo Craton was lodged between the northern and southern halves of the previous supercontinent Rodinia some 750 Ma. The peak in this mountain building event was around 640–610 Ma, but these continental collisions may have continued into the early Cambrian some 530 Ma. The formation of Pannotia was the result of Rodinia turning itself inside out.

When Pannotia had formed, Africa was located at the centre surrounded by the rest of Gondwana: South America, Arabia, Madagascar, India, Antarctica, and Australia. Laurentia, which 'escaped' out of Rodinia, Baltica, and Siberia kept the relative positions they had in Rodinia. The Cathaysian and Cimmerian terranes (continental blocks of southern Asia) were located along the northern margins of east Gondwana. The Avalonian-Cadomian terranes (later to become central Europe, Britain, the North American east coast, and Yucatán) were located along the active northern margins of western Gondwana. This orogeny probably extended north into the Uralian margin of Baltica.

Pannotia formed by subduction of exterior oceans (a mechanism called extroversion) over a geoid low, whereas Pangaea formed by subduction of interior oceans (introversion) over a geoid high perhaps caused by superplumes and slab avalanche events. The oceanic crust subducted by Pannotia formed within the Mirovia superocean that surrounded Rodinia before its 830–750 Ma break-up and were accreted during the late Proterozoic orogenies that resulted from the assembly of Pannotia.

One of the major of these orogenies was the collision between eastern and western Gondwana or the East African Orogeny. The Trans-Saharan Belt in West Africa is the result of the collision between the East Saharan Shield and the West African Craton when 1200–710 Ma volcanic and arc-related rocks were accreted to the margin of this craton. Between 600 and 500 Ma, two Brazilian interior orogens were highly deformed and metamorphosed between a series of colliding cratons: Amazonia, West Africa-São Luís, and São Francisco-Congo-Kasai. The material that accreted included, 950–850 Ma, mafic meta-igneous complexes and younger arc-related rocks.

== Break-up ==
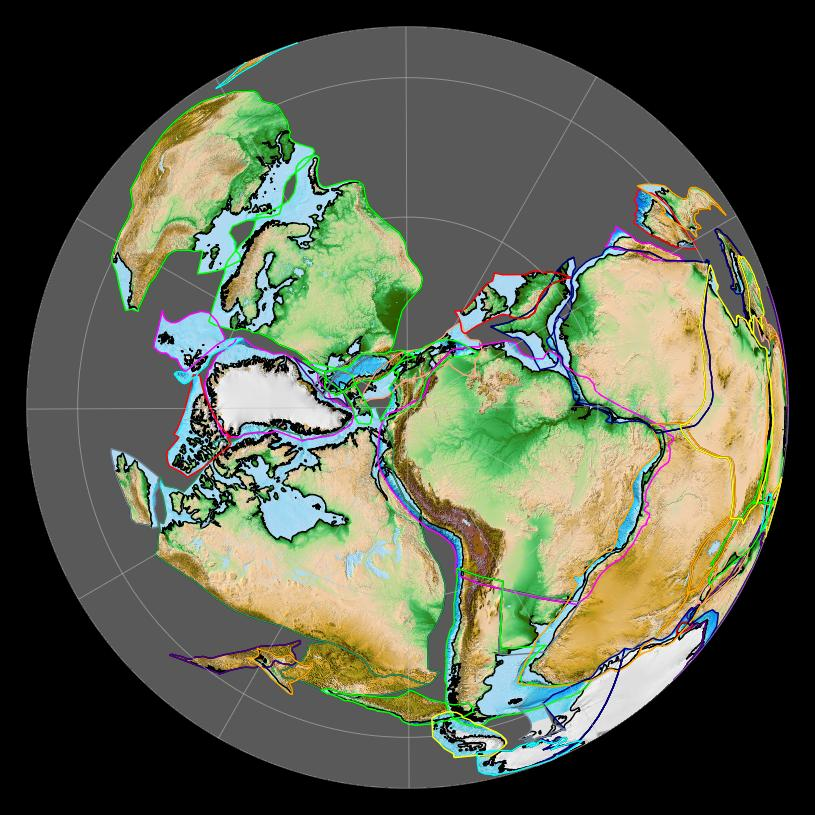
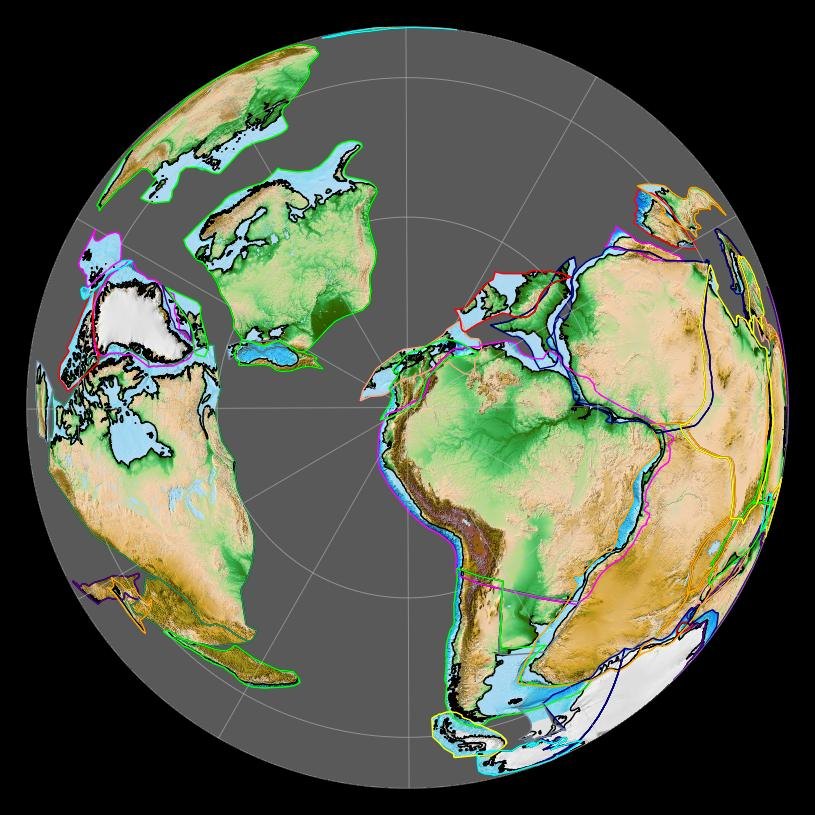
Pannotia formed as Proto-Laurasia was added to Gondwana c. 600 Ma (left) and broke up 550 Ma (right) when Laurasia broke apart.
View centred on the South Pole.

The break-up of Pannotia was accompanied by sea level rise, dramatic changes in climate and ocean water chemistry, and rapid metazoan diversification. Bond, Nickeson & Kominz 1984 found Neoproterozoic passive margin sequences worldwide—the first indication of a Late Neoproterozoic supercontinent but also the traces of its demise.

The Iapetus Ocean started to open while Pannotia was being assembled, 200 Ma after the break-up of Rodinia. This opening of the Iapetus and other Cambrian seas coincided with the first steps in the evolution of soft-bodied metazoans, and also made a myriad of habitats available for them; this led to the so-called Cambrian explosion, the rapid evolution of skeletalized metazoans.

Trilobites originated in the Neoproterozoic and began to diversify before the break-up of Pannotia 600–550 Ma, as evidenced by their ubiquitous presence in the fossil record, and the lack of vicariance patterns in their lineage.

== See also ==
- Plate tectonics
- Supercontinent cycle
