= Banda Sea triple junction =

Point where three tectonic plates meet

The Banda Sea triple junction is a geologic triple junction where three tectonic plates meet: the Indo-Australian plate, the Pacific plate and the Eurasian plate. It is located on the seafloor of the Banda Sea off the west coast of the island of New Guinea. The plate boundaries which meet at this triple junction are all subduction zones (trenches).
