= Plume tectonics =

Geophysical theory of movement of mantle plumes under tectonic plates

Plume tectonics is a geoscientific theory that finds its roots in the mantle doming concept which was especially popular during the 1930s and initially did not accept major plate movements and continental drifting. It has survived from the 1970s until today in various forms and presentations. It has slowly evolved into a concept that recognises and accepts large-scale plate motions such as envisaged by plate tectonics, but placing them in a framework where large mantle plumes are the major driving force of the system. The initial followers of the concept during the first half of the 20th century are scientists like Beloussov and van Bemmelen, and recently the concept has gained interest especially in Japan, through new compiled work on palaeomagnetism, and is still advocated by the group of scientists elaboration upon Earth expansion. It is nowadays generally not accepted as the main theory to explain the driving forces of tectonic plate movements, although numerous modulations on the concept have been proposed.

The theory focuses on the movements of mantle plumes under tectonic plates, viewing them as the major driving force of movements of (parts of) the Earth's crust. In its more modern form, conceived in the 1970s, it tries to reconcile in one single geodynamic model the horizontalistic concept of plate tectonics, and the verticalistic concepts of mantle plumes, by the gravitational movement of plates away from major domes of the Earth's crust. The existence of various supercontinents in Earth history and their break-up has been associated recently with major upwellings of the mantle.

It is classified together with mantle convection as one of the mechanism that are used to explain the movements of tectonic plates. It also shows affinity with the concept of hot spots which is used in modern-day plate tectonics to generate a framework of specific mantle upwelling points that are relatively stable throughout time and are used to calibrate the plate movements using their location together with paleomagnetic data. Another affinity is the concept of surge tectonics which envisage flows through the mantle as major driving forces of Plate Tectonics.

== See also ==
- Hotspot
