= Mirovia =

Hypothesized superocean surrounding the supercontinent Rodinia in the Neoproterozoic Era

Mirovia or Mirovoi (from Russian мировой, mirovoy, meaning "global") was a hypothesized superocean which may have been a global ocean surrounding the supercontinent Rodinia in the Neoproterozoic Era, about 1 billion to 750 million years ago. Mirovia may be essentially identical to, or the precursor of, the hypothesized Pan-African Ocean, which followed the rifting of Rodinia. The Panthalassa (proto-Pacific) Ocean developed in the Neoproterozoic Era by subduction at the expense of the global Mirovia ocean.

Geologic evidence suggests that the middle Neoproterozoic, the Cryogenian period, was an extreme ice age so intense that Mirovia may have been completely frozen to a depth of 2 km. This is part of the Snowball Earth hypothesis.

== See also ==
- Panthalassa
