= Cuyania =

Ancient microcontinent now part of Argentina

The Precordillera Terrane or Cuyania was an ancient microcontinent or terrane whose history affected many of the older rocks of Cuyo in Argentina. It was separated by oceanic crust from the Chilenia terrane which accreted into it at ~420-390 Ma when Cuyania was already amalgamated with Gondwana. The hypothesized Mejillonia Terrane in the coast of northern Chile is considered by some geologists to be a single block with Cuyania.

The San Rafael Block crops out 200 km to the south of the other exposures of Cuyania and is the southern extension of the terrane.

The Precordillera has been hypothesised to have been derived from Laurentia, the core of North America, which was attached to the western margin of South America during the Precambrian when virtually all continents formed a "proto-Gondwana" supercontinent known as Pannotia. The Precordillera was then part of a proposed "Texas Plateau", a promontory attached to Laurentia similar to the way the Falkland Plateau is attached to South America today. The Texas Plateau was detached from the Gondwana in a rift around 455 Ma after which it collided with the proto-Andean margin of South America, an event known as the Taconic-Famatinian orogeny, and the Precordillera got left behind at its present location within South America.

== See also ==
- Geological history of the Precordillera terrane

== Bibliography ==
- Cingolani, C.; Heredia, S. (2010). "Field guide on the Ordovician of the Sierra Pintada, San Rafael Block, Mendoza". San Miguel de Tucumán, Argentina: Instituto Superior de Correlación Geológica.
- Dalziel, I. W. (1997). "Neoproterozoic-Paleozoic geography and tectonics: Review, hypothesis, environmental speculation". Geological Society of America Bulletin. 109 (1): 16–42. Bibcode:1997GSAB..109...16D. doi:10.1130/0016-7606(1997)109<0016:ONPGAT>2.3.CO;2.
- Rapalini, A. E. (2005). "The accretionary history of southern South America from the latest Proterozoic to the Late Palaeozoic: some palaeomagnetic constraints". Geological Society, London, Special Publications. 246 (1): 305–328. Bibcode:2005GSLSP.246..305R. doi:10.1144/GSL.SP.2005.246.01.12. S2CID 129963126.
- "The Andes — Tectonic Evolution". Department of Geosciences, University of Arizona. August 2002. Archived from the original on 9 November 2015.
