= São Francisco Craton =

Ancient craton in eastern South America

Approximate location of Mesoproterozoic (older than 1.3 Ga) cratons in South America and Africa. The São Luís and the Luis Alves cratonic fragments (Brazil) are shown, but the Arequipa–Antofalla Craton and some minor African cratons are not. Other versions describe the Guiana Shield separated from the Amazonian shield by a depression, and the Saharan Metacraton as a part of this West African craton.

The São Francisco Craton is an ancient craton in the eastern part of South America. The craton crops out in the Brazilian states of Minas Gerais and Bahia.

It includes a number of blocks of Archean basement, separated by orogenic belts. The belts are characterized by sedimentary basins and passive continental margins containing granite intrusions. The Paleoproterozoic (about 2.5 to 2.0 Ga) was the source of orogenic belts and the current configuration of the craton.

The São Francisco Craton around 1.0 Ga ago was in the south of the supercontinent Rodinia, and after the fragmentation of Rodinia in the late Proterozoic (700 Ma) became a member of the supercontinent Gondwana until it fragmented in the Jurassic (about 180 Ma). The subsequent opening of the Atlantic Ocean left Southern Africa in the Congo Craton and the São Francisco block in South America.

The ancient Paleoproterozoic orogenic belts of the São Francisco Craton contain many economically important minerals, particularly those containing iron (as in the Iron Quadrangle) and gold, and are a major source of income for the mining industry in Brazil.

== See also ==
- Geography of Brazil
- Geography of South America
- South American Plate
- Río de la Plata Craton
