= Rodinia =

Hypothetical Neoproterozoic supercontinent

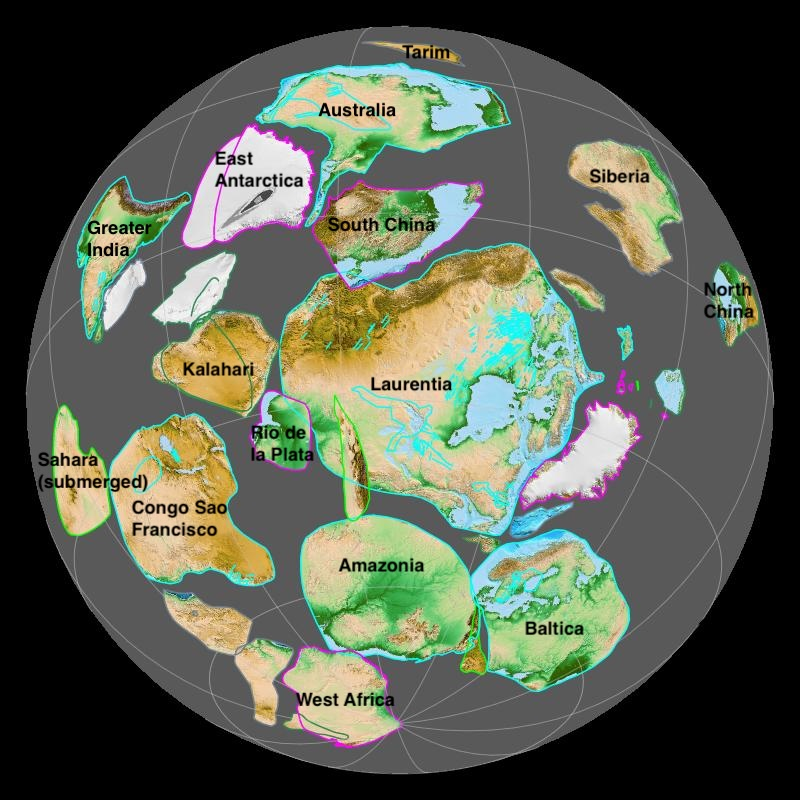
Reconstruction of Rodinia at 900 million years ago, using modern images to illustrate where today's recognisable continents were at the time.

In the geological history of Earth, Rodinia (from Russian родина (rodina) 'motherland, birthplace') was a Mesoproterozoic and Neoproterozoic supercontinent that assembled 1.26–0.90 billion years ago (Ga) and broke up 750–633 million years ago (Ma). Valentine & Moores (1970) were probably the first to recognise a Precambrian supercontinent, which they named "Pangaea I". It was renamed "Rodinia" by McMenamin & McMenamin (1990), who also were the first to produce a plate reconstruction and propose a temporal framework for the supercontinent.

Rodinia formed at c. 1.23 Ga by accretion and collision of fragments produced by breakup of an older supercontinent, Columbia, assembled by global-scale 2.0–1.8 Ga collisional events. Rodinia broke up in the Neoproterozoic, with its continental fragments reassembled to form Pannotia 633–573 Ma. In contrast with Pannotia, little is known about Rodinia's configuration and geodynamic history. Paleomagnetic evidence provides some clues to the paleolatitude of individual pieces of the Earth's crust, but not to their longitude, which geologists have pieced together by comparing similar geologic features, often now widely dispersed.

The extreme cooling of the global climate around 717–635 Ma (the so-called Snowball Earth of the Cryogenian period) and the rapid evolution of primitive life during the subsequent Ediacaran and Cambrian periods are thought to have been triggered by the breaking up of Rodinia or to a slowing down of tectonic processes.

== Geodynamics ==
=== Paleogeographic reconstructions ===
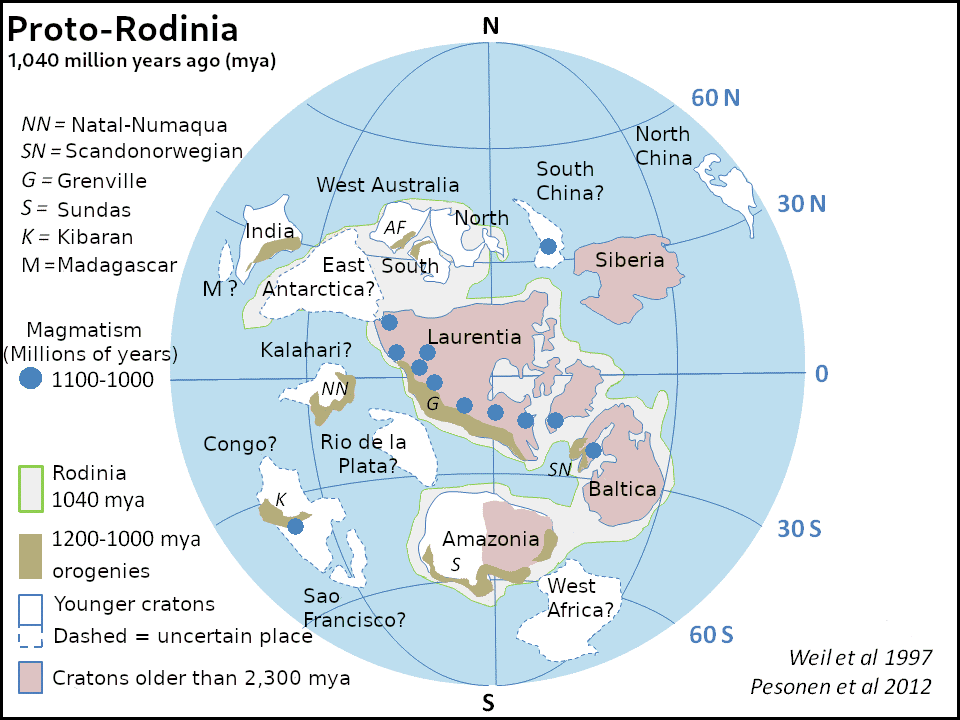
A possible reconstruction of Rodinia's assembly focusing on the orogenies making it.

The idea that a supercontinent existed in the early Neoproterozoic arose in the 1970s, when geologists determined that orogens of this age exist on virtually all cratons. Examples are the Grenville orogeny in North America and the Dalslandian orogeny in Europe. Since then, many alternative reconstructions have been proposed for the configuration of the cratons in this supercontinent. Most of these reconstructions are based on the correlation of the orogens on different cratons. Though the configuration of the core cratons in Rodinia is now reasonably well known, recent reconstructions still differ in many details. Geologists try to decrease the uncertainties by collecting geological and paleomagnetical data.

Life timeline
← / Earth formed; ← / Earliest water; ← / LUCA; ← / Earliest fossils; ← / Great Oxygenation Event; ← / Sexual reproduction; ← / Earliest fungi; ← / Neoproterozoic oxygenation event; ← / Ediacaran biota; ← / Cambrian explosion; ← / Earliest tetrapods; ← / Earliest hominoid
(million years ago)

Most reconstructions show Rodinia's core formed by the North American Craton (the later paleocontinent of Laurentia), surrounded in the southeast with the East European Craton (the later paleocontinent of Baltica), the Amazonian Craton and the West African Craton; in the south with the Río de la Plata and São Francisco cratons; in the southwest with the Congo and Kalahari cratons; and in the northeast with Australia, India and eastern Antarctica. The positions of Siberia and North and South China north of the North American craton differ strongly depending on the reconstruction:

- SWEAT-Configuration (Southwest US-East Antarctica craton): Antarctica is southwest of Laurentia, and Australia is north of Antarctica.
- AUSWUS-Configuration (Australia-western US): Australia is west of Laurentia.
- AUSMEX-Configuration (Australia-Mexico): Australia is at the location of current day Mexico relative to Laurentia.
- The "Missing-link" model by Li et al. 2008 which has South China between Australia and the west coast of Laurentia. A revised "Missing-link" model is proposed in which Tarim Block serves as an extended or alternative missing-link between Australia and Laurentia.
- Siberia attached to the western US (via the Belt Supergroup), as in Sears & Price 2000.

Little is known about the paleogeography before the formation of Rodinia. Paleomagnetic and geologic data are only definite enough to form reconstructions from the breakup of Rodinia onwards. Rodinia is considered to have formed between 1.3 and 1.23 Ga and broke up again before 750 Ma. Rodinia was surrounded by the superocean Mirovia.

According to J.D.A. Piper, Rodinia is one of two models for the configuration and history of the continental crust in the latter part of Precambrian times. The other is Paleopangea, Piper's own concept. Piper proposes an alternative hypothesis for this era and the previous ones. This idea rejects that Rodinia ever existed as a transient supercontinent subject to progressive break-up in the late Proterozoic and instead that this time and earlier times were dominated by a single, persistent "Paleopangaea" supercontinent. As evidence, he suggests an observation that the palaeomagnetic poles from the continental crust assigned to this time conform to a single path between 825 and 633 Ma and latterly to a near-static position between 750 and 633 Ma. This latter solution predicts that break-up was confined to the Ediacaran period and produced the dramatic environmental changes that characterised the transition between the Precambrian and Phanerozoic. However, this theory has been widely criticized, as incorrect applications of paleomagnetic data have been pointed out.

=== Breakup ===
In 2009 UNESCO's International Geoscience Programme project 440, named "Rodinia Assembly and Breakup," concluded that Rodinia broke up in four stages between 825 and 550 Ma:

- The breakup was initiated by a superplume around 825–800 Ma whose influence—such as crustal arching, intense bimodal magmatism, and accumulation of thick rift-type sedimentary successions—has been recorded in South Australia, South China, Tarim, Kalahari, India, and the Arabian-Nubian Craton.
- Rifting progressed in the same cratons 800–750 Ma and spread into Laurentia and perhaps Siberia. India (including Madagascar) and the Congo–São Francisco Craton were either detached from Rodinia during this period or simply never were part of the supercontinent.
- As the central part of Rodinia reached the Equator around 750–700 Ma, a new pulse of magmatism and rifting continued the disassembly in western Kalahari, West Australia, South China, Tarim, and most margins of Laurentia.
- 650–550 Ma several events coincided: the opening of the Iapetus Ocean; the closure of the Braziliano, Adamastor, and Mozambique oceans; and the Pan-African orogeny. The result was the formation of Gondwana.

The Rodinia hypothesis assumes that rifting did not start everywhere simultaneously. Extensive lava flows and volcanic eruptions of Neoproterozoic age are found on most continents, evidence for large scale rifting about 750 Ma. As early as 850 to 800 Ma, a rift developed between the continental masses of present-day Australia, East Antarctica, India and the Congo and Kalahari cratons on one side and later Laurentia, Baltica, Amazonia and the West African and Río de la Plata cratons on the other. This rift developed into the Adamastor Ocean during the Ediacaran.

Around 550 Ma, near the boundary between the Ediacaran and Cambrian, the first group of cratons fused again with Amazonia, West Africa and the Río de la Plata cratons during the Pan-African orogeny, which caused the development of Gondwana.

In a separate rifting event about 610 Ma, the Iapetus Ocean formed. The eastern part of this ocean formed between Baltica and Laurentia, the western part between Amazonia and Laurentia. Because the timeframe of this separation and the partially contemporaneous Pan-African orogeny are difficult to correlate, it might be that all continental mass was again joined in one supercontinent between roughly 600 and 550 Ma. This hypothetical supercontinent is called Pannotia.

== Influence on paleoclimate and life ==
Unlike later supercontinents, Rodinia was entirely barren. It existed before complex life colonized on dry land. Based on sedimentary rock analysis, Rodinia's formation happened when the ozone layer was not as extensive as it is now. Ultraviolet light discouraged organisms from inhabiting its interior. Nevertheless, its existence significantly influenced the marine life of its time.

In the Cryogenian, Earth experienced large glaciations, and temperatures were at least as cool as today. Substantial parts of Rodinia may have been covered by glaciers or the southern polar ice cap. Low temperatures may have been exaggerated during the early stages of continental rifting. Geothermal heating peaks in crust about to be rifted, and since warmer rocks are less dense, the crustal rocks rise up relative to their surroundings. This rising creates areas of higher altitude where the air is cooler and ice is less likely to melt with changes in season, and it may explain the evidence of abundant glaciation in the Ediacaran.

The rifting of the continents created new oceans and seafloor spreading, which produces warmer, less dense oceanic crust. Lower-density, hot oceanic crust will not lie as deep as older, cool oceanic lithosphere. In periods with relatively large areas of new lithosphere, the ocean floors come up, causing the sea level to rise. The result was a greater number of shallower seas.

The increased evaporation from the oceans' larger water area may have increased rainfall, which in turn increased the weathering of exposed rock. By inputting data on the ratio of stable isotopes ^{18}O:^{16}O into computer models, it has been shown that in conjunction with quick weathering of volcanic rock, the increased rainfall may have reduced greenhouse gas levels to below the threshold required to trigger the period of extreme glaciation known as Snowball Earth. Increased volcanic activity also introduced into the marine environment biologically active nutrients, which may have played an important role in the earliest animals' development.

== See also ==
- Columbia, for one possible reconstruction of an earlier supercontinent
- Supercontinent cycle
