= Chilenia =

Ancient microcontinent, containing central Chile and western Argentina

Chilenia was an ancient microcontinent or terrane whose history affected many of the older rocks of central Chile and western Argentina. It was once separated by the Oceanic crust from the Cuyania terrane to which it accreted at ~420-390 Ma when Cuyania was already amalgamated with Gondwana.

== See also ==
- Andes – Mountain range in South America.

== Sources ==
- The Andes - Tectonic Evolution
