= Amazonian Craton =

Geologic province in South America

Approximate location of Mesoproterozoic (older than 1.3 Ga) cratons in South America and Africa. The São Luís and Luis Alves cratonic fragments (Brazil) are shown, but the Arequipa–Antofalla Craton, the Sahara Craton, and some minor African cratons are not. Other versions describe the Guiana Shield separated from the Amazonian Shield by a depression.

The Amazonian Craton is a geologic province in South America. It occupies a large portion of the central, north and eastern part of the continent and represents one of Earth's largest cratonic regions. The Guiana Shield and Central Brazil Shield (Guaporé Shield) constitute respectively the northern and southern exhumed parts of the craton. Between the two shields lies the Amazon Rift, a zone of weakness within the craton. Smaller cratons of Precambrian rocks south of the Amazonian Shield are the Río de la Plata Craton and the São Francisco Craton, which lies to the east.

The Río Apa Craton at the Paraguay–Brazil border is considered to be likely just the southern part of the Amazonian Craton. The rocks of Río Apa were deformed during the Sunsás orogeny.

It has been suggested that the Late Mesoproterozoic–Early Neoproterozoic aged Sveconorwegian Orogen in Fennoscandia could have been caused by a continent–continent collision between the continents of Amazonia and Baltica. The question is open if Telemarkia terrane in Norway was derived from the Amazonian Craton, but this possibility does not imply necessarily that there was a continental collision.

== See also ==
- Geography of Brazil
- Geography of South America
- South American Plate – Major tectonic plate
