= Malagasy orogeny =

Indian geological structure

The Malagasy orogeny is the Ediacaran to Cambrian orogeny that resulted as India collided with the already amalgamated African continent that consisted of Azania and the Congo-Tanzania-Bangweulu Block. The orogeny affected the parts of the East African Orogen that are now found in southern India, Madagascar and central Arabia.

The term "Malagasy orogeny" was introduced by Collins & Pisarevsky 2005 for the orogenesis between India and a series of Gondwanan cratonic blocks in present-day Africa (Congo/Tanzania/Bangweulu/Azania). In their reconstruction, India collided with Australia/Mawson in the Kuunga orogeny before the formation of Gondwana. They identified the Betsimisaraka suture in eastern Madagascar as the boundary between the African and India terranes.

== See also ==
- Geology of Madagascar
- Geology of India
- Geology of Tanzania
- Geology of Mozambique
- Geology of South Africa
