= Gondwanide orogeny =

Permian mountain forming tectonic event

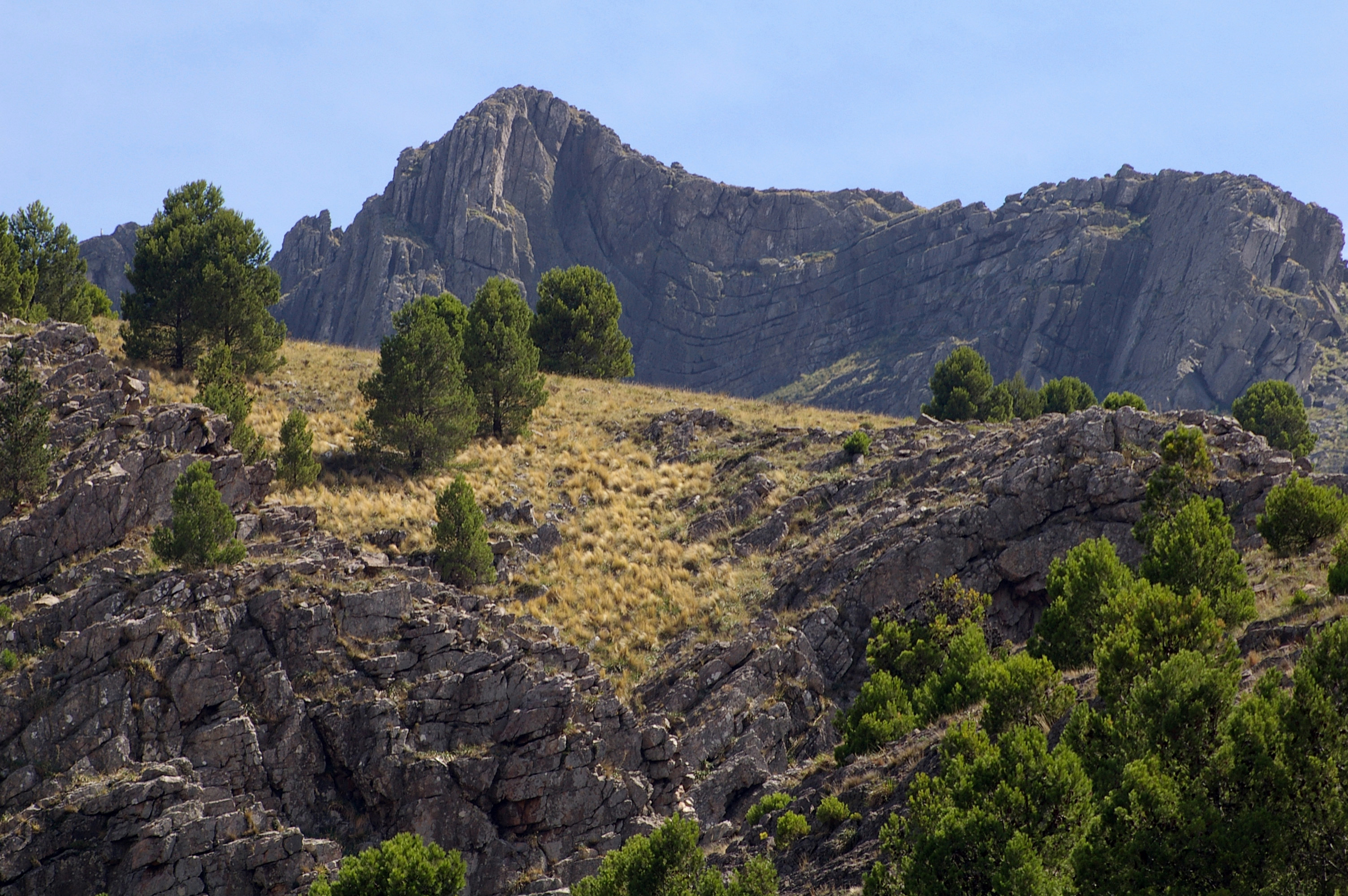
The folds in the Sierra de la Ventana mountains in Buenos Aires Province date back to the Gondwanide orogeny.

The Gondwanide orogeny was an orogeny active in the Permian that affected parts of Gondwana that are by current geography now located in southern South America, South Africa, Antarctica, Australia and New Guinea. The zone of deformation in Argentina extends as a belt south and west of the cratonic nucleus of Río de la Plata–Pampia. The deformation of the orogeny is visible in the Sierra de la Ventana mountains in Argentina and the Cape Fold Belt in South Africa. The Gondwanide orogeny might have been linked with the roughly contemporary San Rafael orogeny of western Argentina.

The Gondwanide orogeny is the successor to the Neoproterozoic-Paleozoic Terra Australis orogeny in Gondwana.

The Gondwanide orogeny was widespread across the southern hemisphere during the Late Permian-Early Triassic. Alexander du Toit described Gondwanide deformation as consisting of asymmetric folding, thrusting and cleavage formation. The uplift and erosion which followed is evidenced by an unconformity across Africa and South America. It is related to the breakup of Gondwanaland.

Following the Gondwanide orogeny southwestern Gondwana entered a period of extensional tectonics and crustal thinning leading to formation of various rift basins (e.g. Cuyo Basin) in the Triassic. (Note: These tectonics are not related to the break-up of Gondwana later in the Mesozoic.)
