= Terra Australis Orogen =

Geological feature

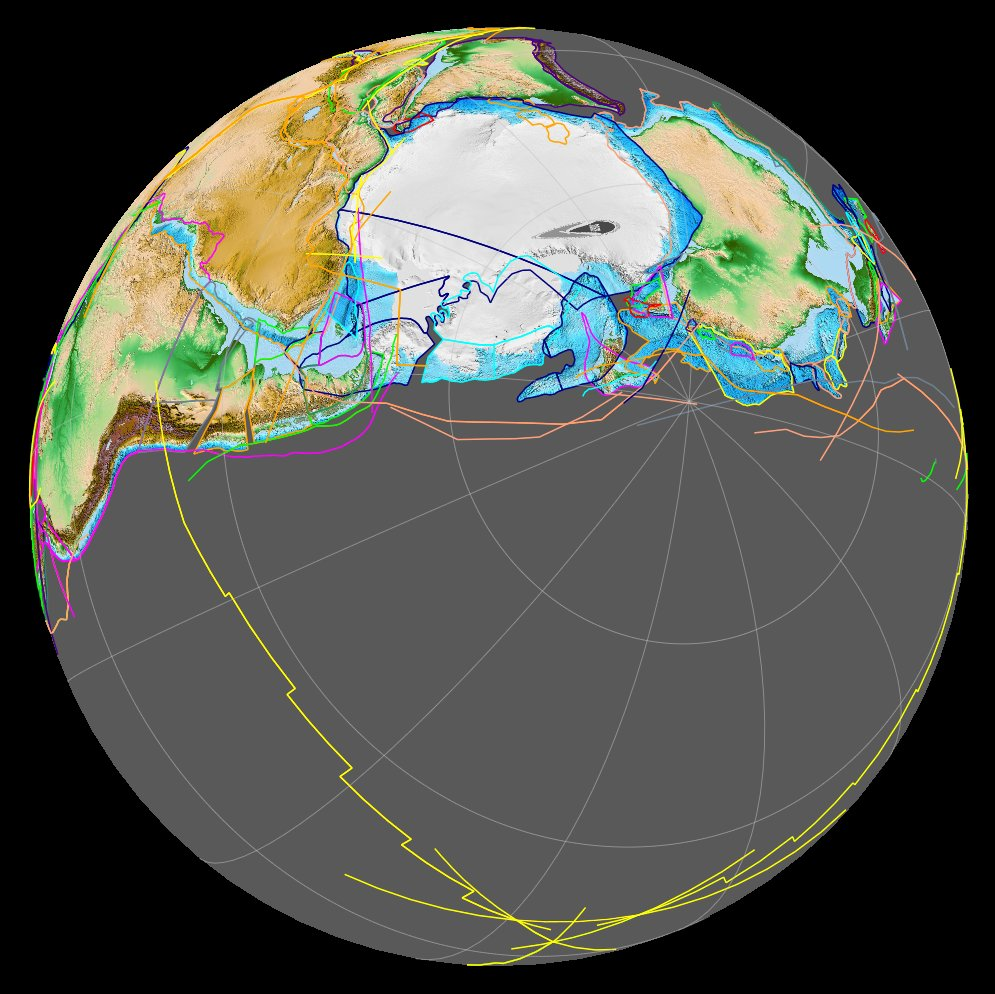
The Terra Australis Orogen at 180 Ma crossing the South Pole (centre right) and flanked by the Phoenix–Farallon (left) and Phoenix–Izanagi (right) ridges. The Pacific plate (triangle at bottom) has just been created.

The Terra Australis Orogen (TAO) was a late-Neoproterozoic-to-Paleozoic-age accretionary orogen that ringed the ancient, active southern margin of the supercontinents Rodinia and later Pannotia (also called Greater Gondwana). This vast orogenic belt stretched for approximately 18,000 km (11,000 mi) along-strike and involved, from west to east (in the ancient, paleogeographic reference frame), landmasses belonging to the modern-day Andean margin of South America, the South African Cape, West Antarctica, Victoria Land in East Antarctica, Eastern Australia, Tasmania, and New Zealand. The formation of the Terra Australis Orogen is associated with the breakup of Rodinia at the end of the Neoproterozoic era and the creation of Panthalassa, the paleo-Pacific Ocean, and it was succeeded by the Gondwanide orogeny with the formation of the supercontinent Pangea in the middle Paleozoic era.

== Origins ==
Terra Australis Orogen formed in the Neoproterozoic and Paleozoic. The decline of orogenic activity in the late Paleozoic is related to the assembly of the supercontinent Pangea. The orogeny did not end by a continental collision and was succeeded by the Gondwanide orogeny. Around 18,000 km (11,000 mi) long and up to 1,600 km (990 mi) wide, the TAO was one of the longest and longest-lived active continental margin in the history of Earth, lasting from the beginning of its formation during the break-up of the Neoproterozoic supercontinent Rodinia.

The TAO evolved through a series of extensional back-arcs separated by compressional events when the subducting oceanic plate got stuck in Gondwana's margin.

As Gondwana was amalgamated in the Early Palaeozoic during the so-called Pan-African orogenies the TAO propagated along the southern (modern coordinates) Proto-Pacific/Iapetus margin of the supercontinent. The TAO ended c. 300 to 230 Ma with the Gondwanide orogeny. This and younger orogens covers most of the outboard margin of the TAO, and, likewise, the inboard margin is almost entirely covered by younger deposits and ice but remains exposed in Australia along the Torrens Hinge Line or Delamarian orogeny. One end of the TAO was a series of terranes (Avalonia–Carolina–Cadomia) which were rifted off the western margin of Gondwana and added to Laurentia in the Late Palaeozoic, while its other end probably reached past Australia into New Guinea.

In 1937 Alexander du Toit proposed the Samfrau Orogeny as an evidence for Gondwana. His concept includes the orogenies of West Gondwana and orogenies that are now considered separate events but excludes those of East Gondwana.

== See also ==
- Terra Australis
