= East African Orogeny =

Main stage in the Neoproterozoic assembly of East and West Gondwana

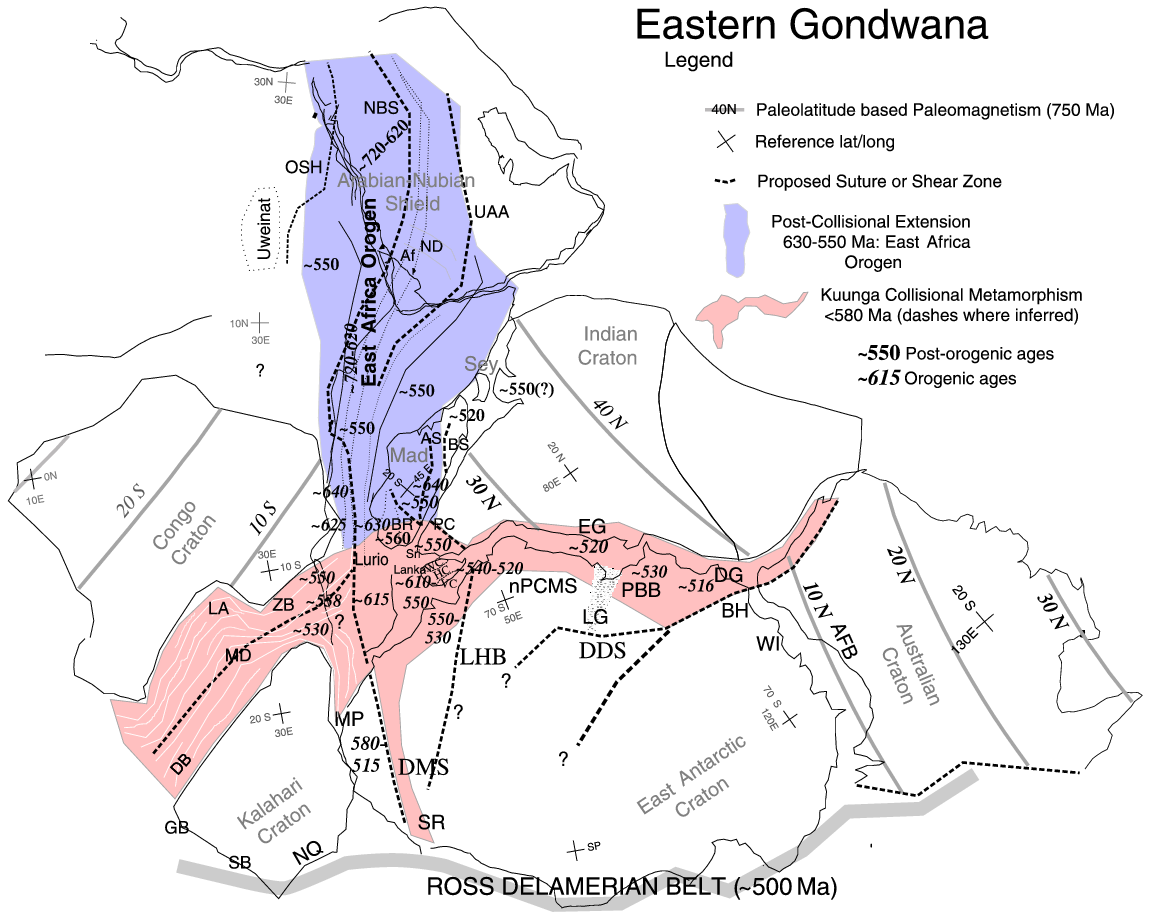
The East African and Kuungan orogens

The East African Orogeny (EAO) is the main stage in the Neoproterozoic assembly of East and West Gondwana (Australia–India–Antarctica and Africa–South America) along the Mozambique Belt.

== Gondwana assembly ==
The notion that Gondwana was assembled during the Late Precambrian from two older fragments along the Pan-African Mozambique Belt was first proposed in the early 1980s. A decade later this continental collision was named the East African Orogeny, but it was also realised that this was not the simple bringing together of two halves. Rather, it was the piecemeal assembly of several much smaller cratonic elements that once formed an earlier supercontinent (today known as Rodinia), a process that eventually culminated in the relatively short-lived Gondwanan supercontinent.

Two partly incomparable scenarios have been proposed for this assembly. In one model, the EAO evolved from an accretionary orogeny involving the amalgamation of arcs and evolved into a collisional orogeny when the Neoproterozoic continent Azania collided with the Congo-Tanzania-Bangweulu Block at c. 640 Ma. In another model, the assembly of East Gondwana c. 750 to 530 Ma was a multiphase process which included two main periods of orogenesis: the older EAO (c. 750 to 620 Ma) and the younger Kuunga Orogeny (c. 570 to 530 Ma). In the former scenario the Kuunga Orogeny of the latter scenario are two coeval events: the collisions between India and Australia-East Antarctica and Azania and India. Furthermore, the two orogens of the latter scenario intersect in Madagascar, the proposed location of the Azania-India collision, and this part of the Kuunga Orogeny should be renamed the Malagasy Orogeny.

== Erosion and Cambrian explosion ==
The East African orogeny resulted in the formation of an enormous mountain chain, known as the Transgondwanan Supermountain, which was more than 8,000 km (5,000 mi) long and 1,000 km (620 mi) wide. The sedimentary deposition from this supermountain, known as the Gondwana Super-fan, exceeded 100×10^{6} km^{3} (24×10^{6} mi^{3}) or the equivalent to covering the United States with c. 10 km (6.2 mi) of sediment, lasted for 260 million years and coincided with the Cambrian explosion, the sudden radiation of eumetazoan life (animals with nervous tissues) c. 550 Ma. These unprecedented sedimentary depositions probably made possible the diversification of early animal life.

The orogen was eroded to such extent that by the Ordovician epoch it had been leveled to a planation surface in modern Ethiopia.

== Cenozoic reopening ==
The Cenozoic East African Rift System mostly evolved along the complex pattern of Proterozoic prerift systems in eastern Africa. It passes through the Mozambique Belt east of the Tanzania Craton.

== Sources ==
- Aulbach, S.; Rudnick, R. L.; McDonough, W. F. (2011). Evolution of the lithospheric mantle beneath the East African Rift in Tanzania and its potential signatures in rift magmas. Vol. 478. pp. 105–125. doi:10.1130/2011.2478(06). ISBN 978-0-8137-2478-2.
- Collins, A. S.; Pisarevsky, S. A. (2005). "Amalgamating eastern Gondwana: The evolution of the Circum-Indian Orogens". Earth-Science Reviews. 71 (3–4): 229–270. Bibcode:2005ESRv...71..229C. doi:10.1016/j.earscirev.2005.02.004.
- Collins, A. S.; Windley, B. F. (2002). "The tectonic evolution of central and northern Madagascar and its place in the final assembly of Gondwana" (PDF). The Journal of Geology. 110 (3): 325–339. Bibcode:2002JG....110..325C. doi:10.1086/339535. hdl:2440/34282.
- McWilliams, M. O. (1981). Palaeomagnetism and Precambrian tectonic evolution of Gondwana. Vol. 4. pp. 649–687. doi:10.1016/S0166-2635(08)70031-8. ISBN 978-0-444-41910-1.
- Meert, J. G. (2003). "A synopsis of events related to the assembly of eastern Gondwana" (PDF). Tectonophysics. 362 (1): 1–40. Bibcode:2003Tectp.362....1M. doi:10.1016/S0040-1951(02)00629-7.
- Meert, J. G.; Lieberman, B. S. (2008). "The Neoproterozoic assembly of Gondwana and its relationship to the Ediacaran–Cambrian radiation". Gondwana Research. 14 (1): 5–21. Bibcode:2008GondR..14....5M. doi:10.1016/j.gr.2007.06.007. S2CID 2814283.
- Nance, R. D.; Murphy, J. B.; Santosh, M. (2014). "The supercontinent cycle: a retrospective essay". Gondwana Research. 25 (1): 4–29. Bibcode:2014GondR..25....4N. doi:10.1016/j.gr.2012.12.026.
- Ring, U. (1994). "The influence of preexisting structure on the evolution of the Cenozoic Malawi rift (East African rift system)". Tectonics. 13 (2): 313–326. Bibcode:1994Tecto..13..313R. doi:10.1029/93TC03188.
- Squire, R. J.; Campbell, I. H.; Allen, C. M.; Wilson, C. J. (2006). "Did the Transgondwanan Supermountain trigger the explosive radiation of animals on Earth?" (PDF). Earth and Planetary Science Letters. 250 (1): 116–133. Bibcode:2006E&PSL.250..116S. doi:10.1016/j.epsl.2006.07.032.
- Stern, R. J. (1994). "Arc assembly and continental collision in the Neoproterozoic East African Orogen: implications for the consolidation of Gondwanaland" (PDF). Annual Review of Earth and Planetary Sciences. 22 (1): 319–351. Bibcode:1994AREPS..22..319S. doi:10.1146/annurev.ea.22.050194.001535.
