= Mawson (continent) =

Historical continent
- Type: continent
- Today part of: Australia (part); Eastern Antarctica (part)

Locations in Antarctica

The Mawson Continent (or Mawson Block, Mawson Craton (Note: Fanning et al. (1996) first used the term "Mawson Continent" to describe the Archean-Mesoproterozoic Gawler craton of southern Australia and the correlated terrains of Antarctica. Other authors have used the term "Mawson Block" and "Mawson Craton".)) was a continent that may have formed around about 1730 Ma (1,730 million years ago). It included the Gawler craton of southern Australia and correlated terrains in Antarctica. Since very little of the historical continent is exposed, the full extent is conjectural.

== Gawler–Adélie Craton ==
The Gawler craton and Terre Adélie craton share late Archean and early Proterozoic tectono-thermal events, and may be considered to be a single terrain from the Archean until rifting in the Cretaceous. There are correlatable timelines between the Gawler–Adélie Craton, Curnamona Province and North Australian Craton around 2500–2430 Ma, 2000 Ma, 1865–1850 Ma, 1730–1690 Ma and 1600–1550 Ma. It is therefore plausible that throughout the Paleoproterozoic the Gawler–Adélie Craton and North Australian Craton were joined into a single continental terrain.

== Formation of Mawson Continent ==
The Mawson Continent seems to have formed during the Kimban orogeny of around 1730–1690 Ma when the Gawler–Adélie Craton combined with the crust of the Miller Range of the Transantarctic Mountains. Later, around 1600–1550 Ma, the Coompana Block and its Antarctic extension was joined to the continent. The extent of the Mawson Continent is uncertain since Australia is now widely covered by Neoproterozoic to Phanerozoic rocks and Antarctica is almost entirely covered by ice and snow.

== Extent of the continent ==
The Gawler craton, Terre Adélie craton, Miller Range and Shackleton Range have few tectono-thermal events in common, apart from tectonism around 1700 Ma. Airborne and satellite magnetic geophysical data suggest that the Gawler-Adélie cratons differ in fundamental ways from the Miller Range and other parts of the East Antarctic Shield. There is evidence that suggests that the Miller Range terrain was accreted to the Gawler–Adélie Craton during the 1730–1690 Ma Kimban–Nimrod Orogeny, with a suture zone that may be at or near the location of the Nimrod Group. Australia and Antarctica separated between 85 Ma and 30 Ma.

Tectonics in the Southern Terrane of the Shackleton Range during the Paleoproterozoic were similar to that of the Mawson Continent, which may mean that this continent extends over the Eastern Antarctic Shield and includes the Shackleton Range. However, the correlations between the Mawson Continent and Shackleton Range do not prove the Shackleton Range was part of the continent, since there could have been rifting or accretion events during the Mesoproterozoic and Neoproterozoic.

== Sources ==
- Antarctic Geology, Australian Antarctic Division, 27 October 2020
- Payne, Justin L.; Hand, Martin; Barovich, Karin M.; Reid, Anthony; Evans, David A. D. (2009), "Correlations and reconstruction models for the 2500–1500 Ma evolution of the Mawson Continent", Special Publications, vol. 323, Geological Society, London, pp. 319–355, doi:10.1144/SP323.16
- Will, Thomas; Zeh, A.; Gerdes, Axel; Frimmel, Hartwig; Millar, I.L.; Schmädicke, E. (2009), "Palaeoproterozoic to Palaeozoic magmatic and metamorphic events in the Shackleton Range, East Antarctica: Constraints from zircon and monazite dating, and implications for the amalgamation of Gondwana", Precambrian Research, 172 (1–2): 25–45, doi:10.1016/j.precamres.2009.03.008
