= Gondwana =

Neoproterozoic to Cretaceous landmass

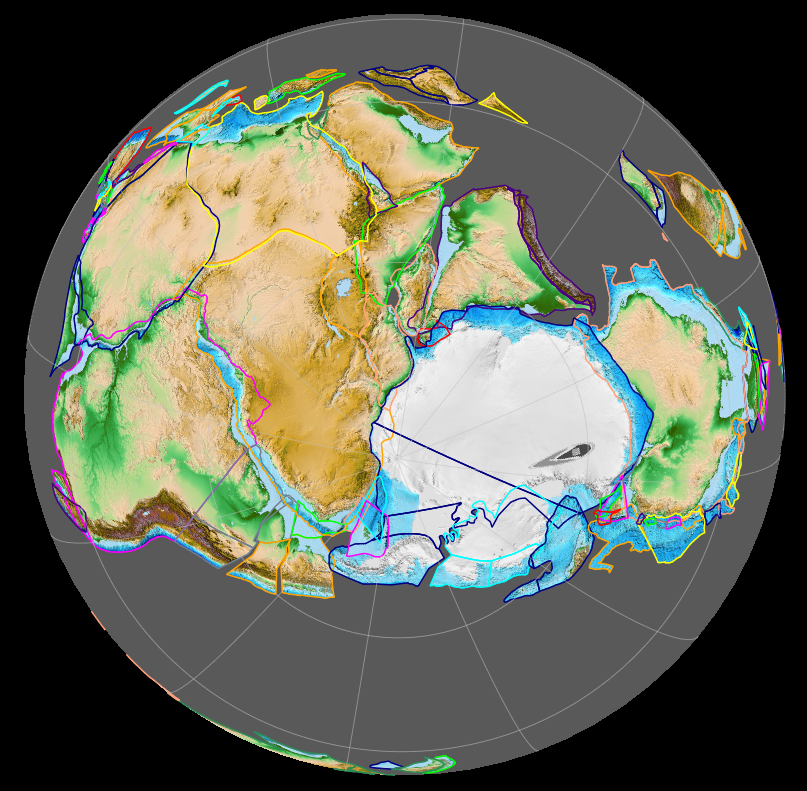
- Paleomap showing Gondwana 420 million years ago (Late Silurian)

Historical continent
- Formed: 600 Ma
- Type: Supercontinent
- Today part of: Africa; North America; South America; Australia; India; Arabia; Antarctica; Balkans
- Smaller continents: South America; Africa; Australia; Antarctica; Zealandia
- Tectonic plates: African Plate; Antarctic Plate; Indo-Australian Plate; South American Plate

Gondwana (/ɡɒnˈdwɑːnə/ gon-DWAHN-ə; Sanskrit: गोण्डवन, romanized: Gōṇḍavana, lit. 'forest of the Gonds', pronounced [goːɳɖɐʋɐnɐ], commonly also referred to as Gondwanaland), was a paleocontinent. The remnants of Gondwana make up around two-thirds of today's continental area, including South America, Africa, Antarctica, Australia, Zealandia, Arabia, and the Indian subcontinent.

Gondwana was formed by the accretion of several cratons during the Neoproterozoic (large stable blocks of the Earth's crust), beginning c. 800 to 650 million years ago (Ma) with the East African Orogeny, the collision of India and Madagascar with East Africa, and culminating in c. 600 to 530 Ma with the overlapping Brasiliano and Kuunga orogenies, the collision of South America with Africa, and the addition of Australia and Antarctica, respectively. Eventually, Gondwana became the largest piece of continental crust of the Paleozoic Era, covering an area of some 100,000,000 km^{2} (39,000,000 sq mi), about one-fifth of the Earth's surface. It fused with Laurasia during the Carboniferous to form Pangaea.

Gondwana began to separate from northern Pangea (Laurasia) during the Triassic, and started to fragment during the Early Jurassic (around 180 Ma). The final stages of break-up saw the fragmentation of the Antarctic land bridge (involving the separation of Antarctica from South America and Australia, forming the Drake and Tasmanian Passages), which occurred during the Paleogene (from around 66 to 23 Ma). Gondwana was not considered a supercontinent by the earliest definition, since the landmasses of Baltica, Laurentia, and Siberia were separated from it.

Regions that were part of Gondwana shared floral, fungal and faunal elements that persist to the present day.

== Name ==
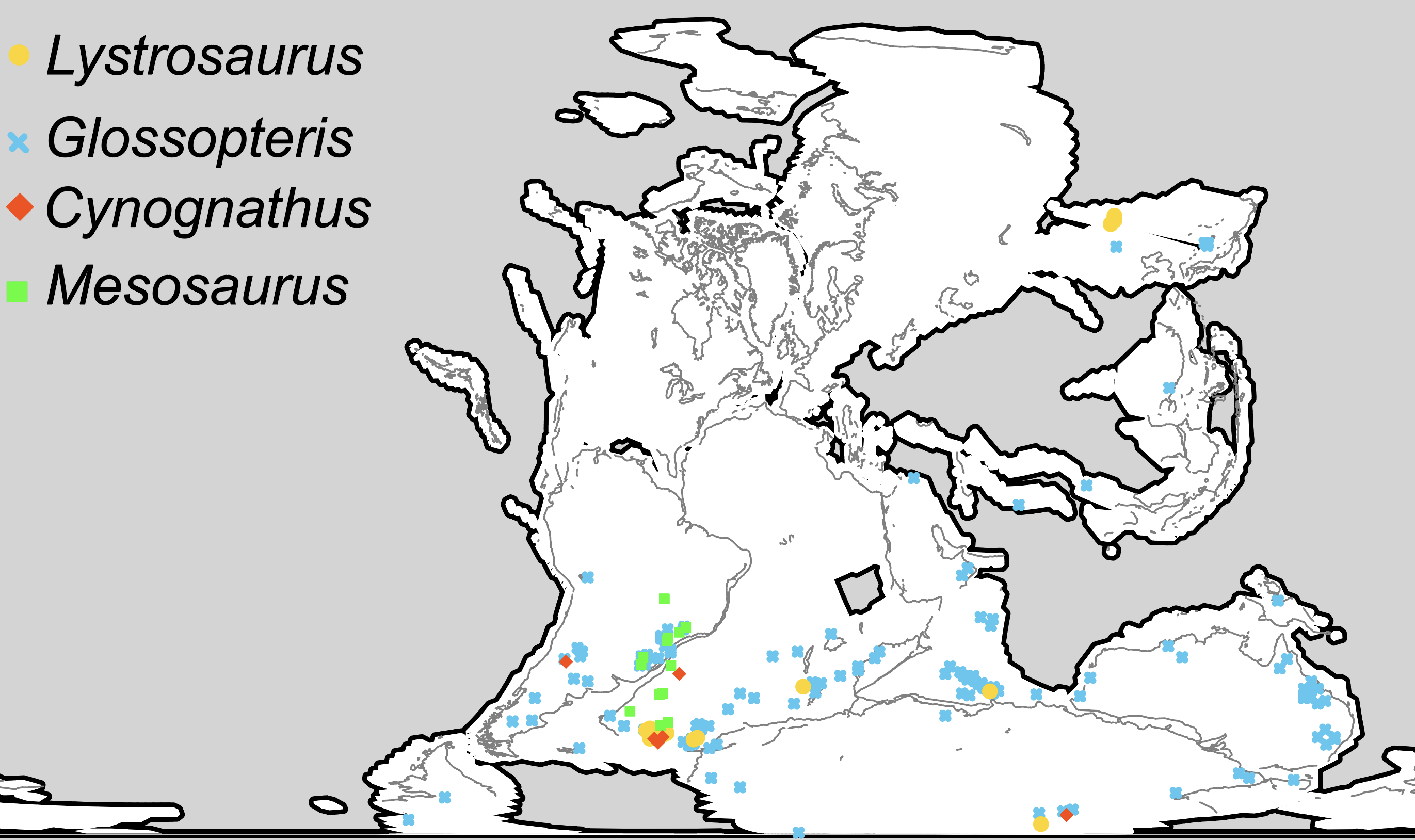
Distribution of four Permian and Triassic fossil groups used as biogeographic evidence for continental drift, land bridging

The continent of Gondwana was named by the Austrian scientist Eduard Suess after the Indian region of the same name, which is derived from Sanskrit गोण्डवन Gōṇḍavana ('forest of the Gonds'). The name had been previously used in a geological context, first by H. B. Medlicott in 1872, from which the Gondwana sedimentary sequences (Permian-Triassic) are also described.

Some scientists prefer the term "Gondwanaland" for the supercontinent to make a clear distinction between the region and the supercontinent.

== Formation ==
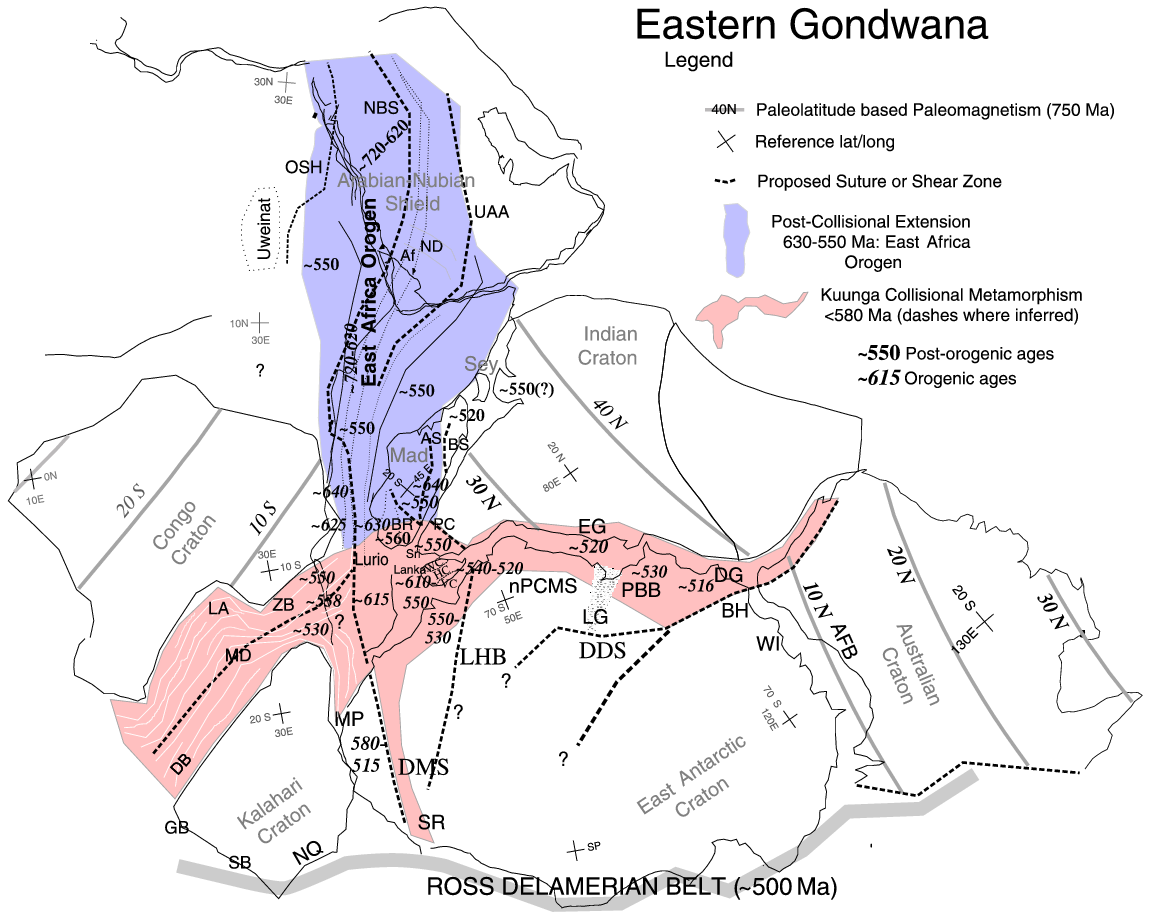
Eastern Gondwana. 620 to 550 Ma post-collisional extension of the East African Orogeny in blue and 570 to 530 Ma collisional metamorphism of the Kuunga orogeny in red.

The assembly of Gondwana was a protracted process during the Neoproterozoic and Paleozoic, which remains incompletely understood because of the lack of paleo-magnetic data. Several orogenies, collectively known as the Pan-African orogeny, caused the continental fragments of a much older supercontinent, Rodinia, to amalgamate. One of those orogenic belts, the Mozambique Belt, formed 800 to 650 Ma and was originally interpreted as the suture between East (India, Madagascar, Antarctica, Australia) and West Gondwana (Africa and South America). Three orogenies were recognised during the 1990s as a result of data sets compiled on behalf of oil and mining companies: the East African Orogeny (650 to 800 Ma) and Kuunga orogeny (including the Malagasy orogeny in southern Madagascar) (550 Ma), the collision between East Gondwana and East Africa in two steps, and the Brasiliano orogeny (660 to 530 Ma), the successive collision between South American and African cratons.

The last stages of Gondwanan assembly overlapped with the opening of the Iapetus Ocean between Laurentia and western Gondwana. During this interval, the Cambrian explosion occurred. Laurentia was docked against the western shores of a united Gondwana for a brief period near the Precambrian and Cambrian boundary, forming the short-lived and still disputed supercontinent Pannotia.

The Mozambique Ocean separated the Congo–Tanzania–Bangweulu Block of central Africa from Neoproterozoic India (India, the Antongil Block in far eastern Madagascar, the Seychelles, and the Napier and Rayner Complexes in East Antarctica). The Azania continent (much of central Madagascar, the Horn of Africa and parts of Yemen and Arabia) was an island in the Mozambique Ocean.

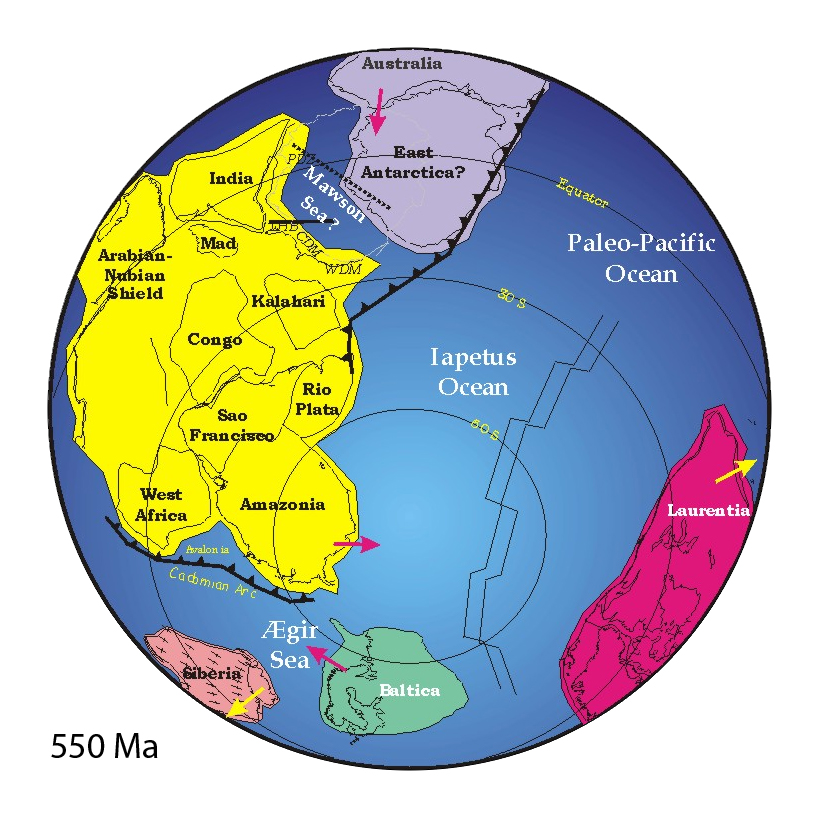
Reconstruction showing final stages of assembly of Gondwana, 550 Ma

The continents of Australia and East Antarctica were still separated from India, eastern Africa, and Kalahari by c. 600 Ma, when most of western Gondwana had already been amalgamated. By c. 550 Ma, India had reached its Gondwanan position, which initiated the Kuunga orogeny (also known as the Pinjarra orogeny). Meanwhile, on the other side of the newly forming Africa, Kalahari collided with Congo and Rio de la Plata which closed the Adamastor Ocean. c. 540–530 Ma, the closure of the Mozambique Ocean brought India next to Australia–East Antarctica, and both North China and South China were in proximity to Australia.

As the rest of Gondwana formed, a complex series of orogenic events assembled the eastern parts of Gondwana (eastern Africa, Arabian-Nubian Shield, Seychelles, Madagascar, India, Sri Lanka, East Antarctica, Australia) c. 750 to 530 Ma. First, the Arabian-Nubian Shield collided with eastern Africa (in the Kenya-Tanzania region) in the East African Orogeny c.750 to 620 Ma. Then Australia and East Antarctica were merged with the remaining Gondwana c. 570 to 530 Ma in the Kuunga Orogeny.

The later Malagasy orogeny at about 550–515 Mya affected Madagascar, eastern East Africa and southern India. In it, Neoproterozoic India collided with the already combined Azania and Congo–Tanzania–Bangweulu Block, suturing along the Mozambique Belt.

The 18,000 km-long (11,000 mi) Terra Australis Orogen developed along Gondwana's western, southern, and eastern margins. Proto-Gondwanan Cambrian arc belts from this margin have been found in eastern Australia, Tasmania, New Zealand, and Antarctica. Though these belts formed a continuous arc chain, the direction of subduction was different between the Australian-Tasmanian and New Zealand-Antarctica arc segments.

== Peri-Gondwana development: Paleozoic rifts and accretions ==
Many terranes were accreted to Eurasia during Gondwana's existence, but the Cambrian or Precambrian origin of many of these terranes remains uncertain. For example, some Paleozoic terranes and microcontinents that now make up Central Asia, often called the "Kazakh" and "Mongolian terranes", were progressively amalgamated into the continent Kazakhstania in the late Silurian. Whether these blocks originated on the shores of Gondwana is not known.

In the Early Paleozoic, the Armorican terrane, which today form large parts of France, was part of Peri-Gondwana; the Rheic Ocean closed in front of it and the Paleo-Tethys Ocean opened behind it. Precambrian rocks from the Iberian Peninsula suggest that it, too, formed part of core Gondwana before its detachment as an orocline in the Variscan orogeny close to the Carboniferous–Permian boundary.

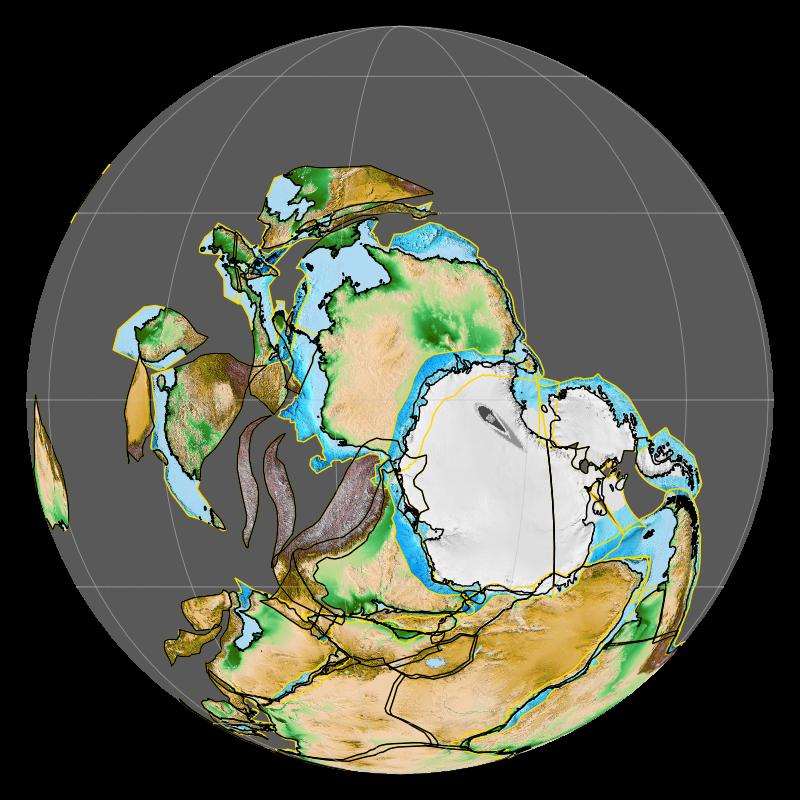
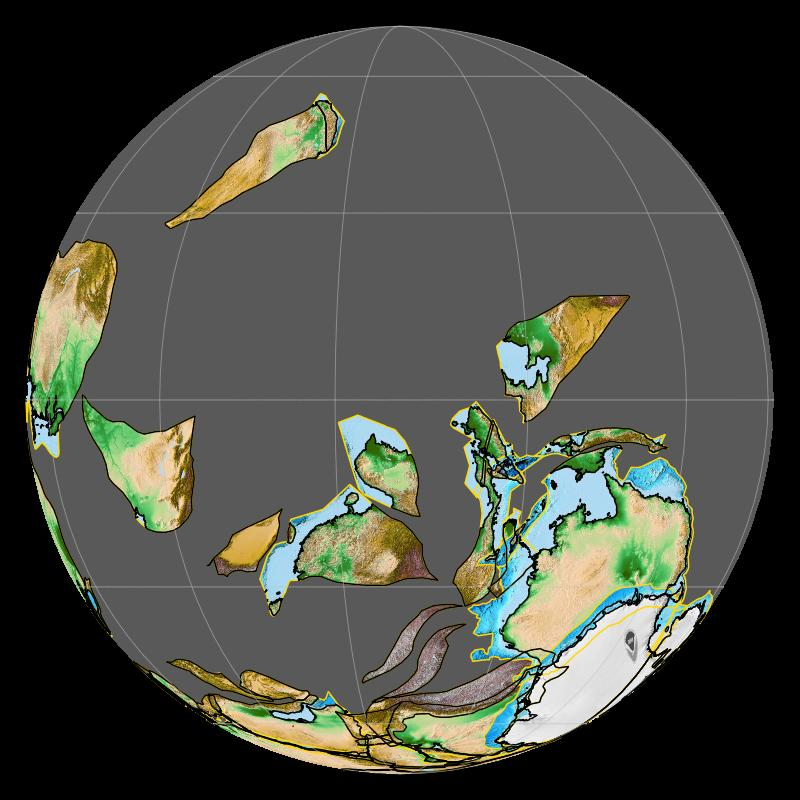
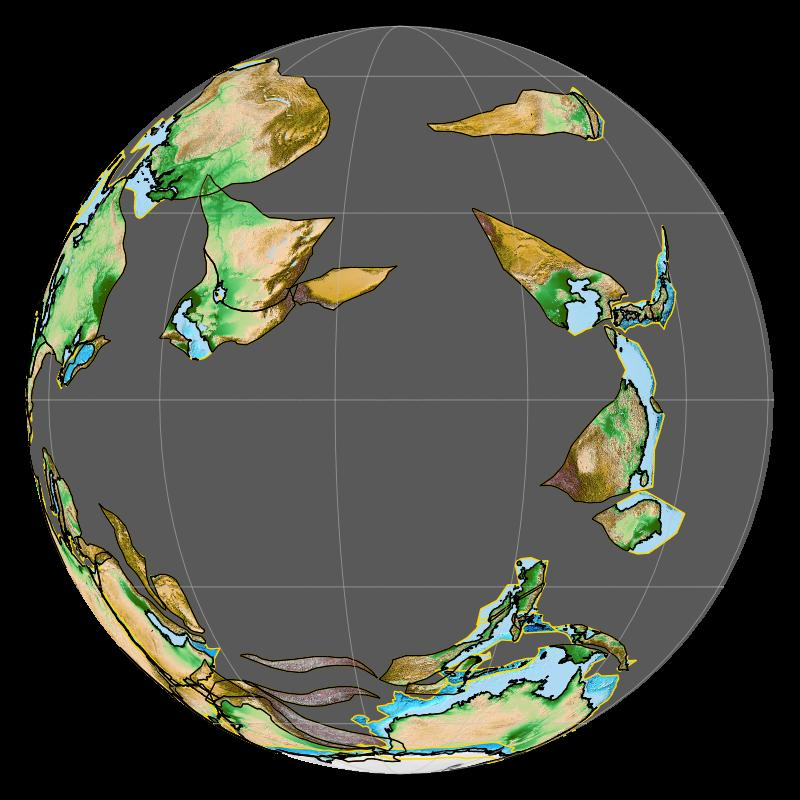
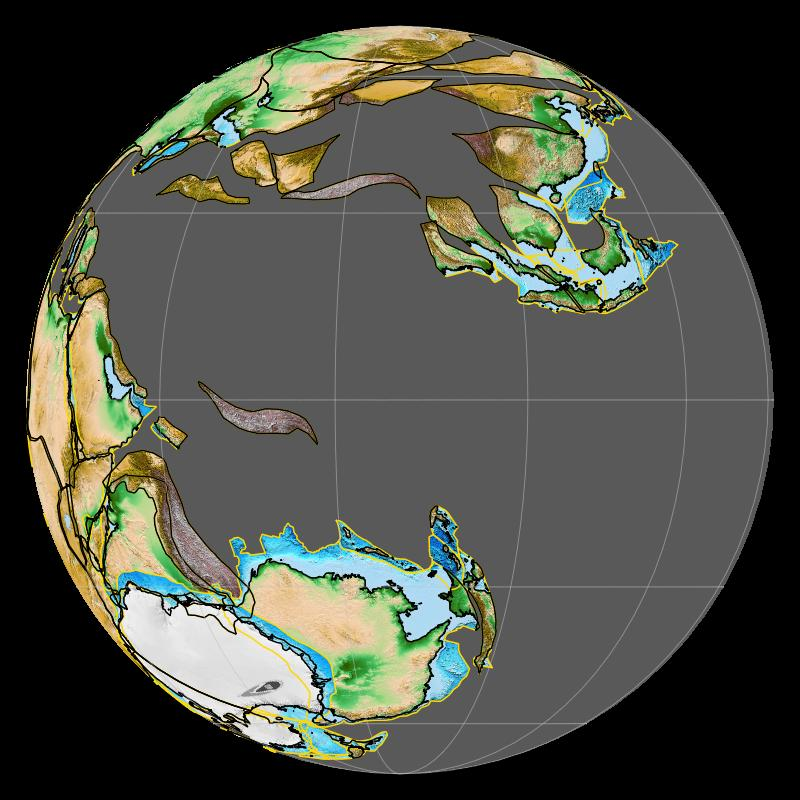
Journey of the Asian blocks from Gondwana to Laurasia, Late Ordovician to Early Jurassic (450, 350, 300, and 200 Ma).
View centred on 0°S,105°E.

South-east Asia was made of Gondwanan and Cathaysian continental fragments that were assembled during the Mid-Paleozoic and Cenozoic. This process can be divided into three phases of rifting along Gondwana's northern margin: first, in the Devonian, North and South China, together with Tarim and Quidam (north-western China) rifted, opening the Paleo-Tethys behind them. These terranes accreted to Asia during Late Devonian and Permian. Second, in the Late Carboniferous to Early Permian, Cimmerian terranes opened Meso-Tethys Ocean; Sibumasu and Qiangtang were added to south-east Asia during Late Permian and Early Jurassic. Third, in the Late Triassic to Late Jurassic, Lhasa, Burma, Woyla terranes opened the Neo-Tethys Ocean; Lhasa collided with Asia during the Early Cretaceous, and Burma and Woyla during the Late Cretaceous.

Gondwana's long, northern margin remained a mostly passive margin throughout the Paleozoic. The Early Permian opening of the Neo-Tethys Ocean along this margin produced a long series of terranes, many of which were and still are being deformed in the Himalayan orogeny. These terranes are, from Turkey to north-eastern India: the Taurides in southern Turkey; the Lesser Caucasus Terrane in Georgia; the Sanand, Alborz, and Lut terranes in Iran; the Mangysglak Terrane in the Caspian Sea; the Afghan Terrane; the Karakorum Terrane in northern Pakistan; and the Lhasa and Qiangtang terranes in Tibet. The Permian–Triassic widening of the Neo-Tethys pushed all these terranes across the Equator and over to Eurasia.

=== Southwestern accretions ===
During the Neoproterozoic to Paleozoic phase of the Terra Australis Orogen, a series of terranes were rafted from the proto-Andean margin when the Iapetus Ocean opened, to be added back to Gondwana during the closure of that ocean. During the Paleozoic, some blocks which helped to form parts of the Southern Cone of South America, include a piece transferred from Laurentia when the west edge of Gondwana scraped against southeast Laurentia in the Ordovician. This is the Cuyania or Precordillera terrane of the Famatinian orogeny in northwest Argentina which may have continued the line of the Appalachians southwards. Chilenia terrane accreted later against Cuyania. The collision of the Patagonian terrane with the southwestern Gondwanan occurred in the late Paleozoic. Subduction-related igneous rocks from beneath the North Patagonian Massif have been dated at 320–330 million years old, indicating that the subduction process initiated in the early Carboniferous. This was relatively short-lived (lasting about 20 million years), and initial contact of the two landmasses occurred in the mid-Carboniferous, with broader collision during the early Permian. In the Devonian, an island arc named Chaitenia accreted to Patagonia in what is now south-central Chile.

== Gondwana as part of Pangaea: Late Paleozoic to Early Mesozoic ==
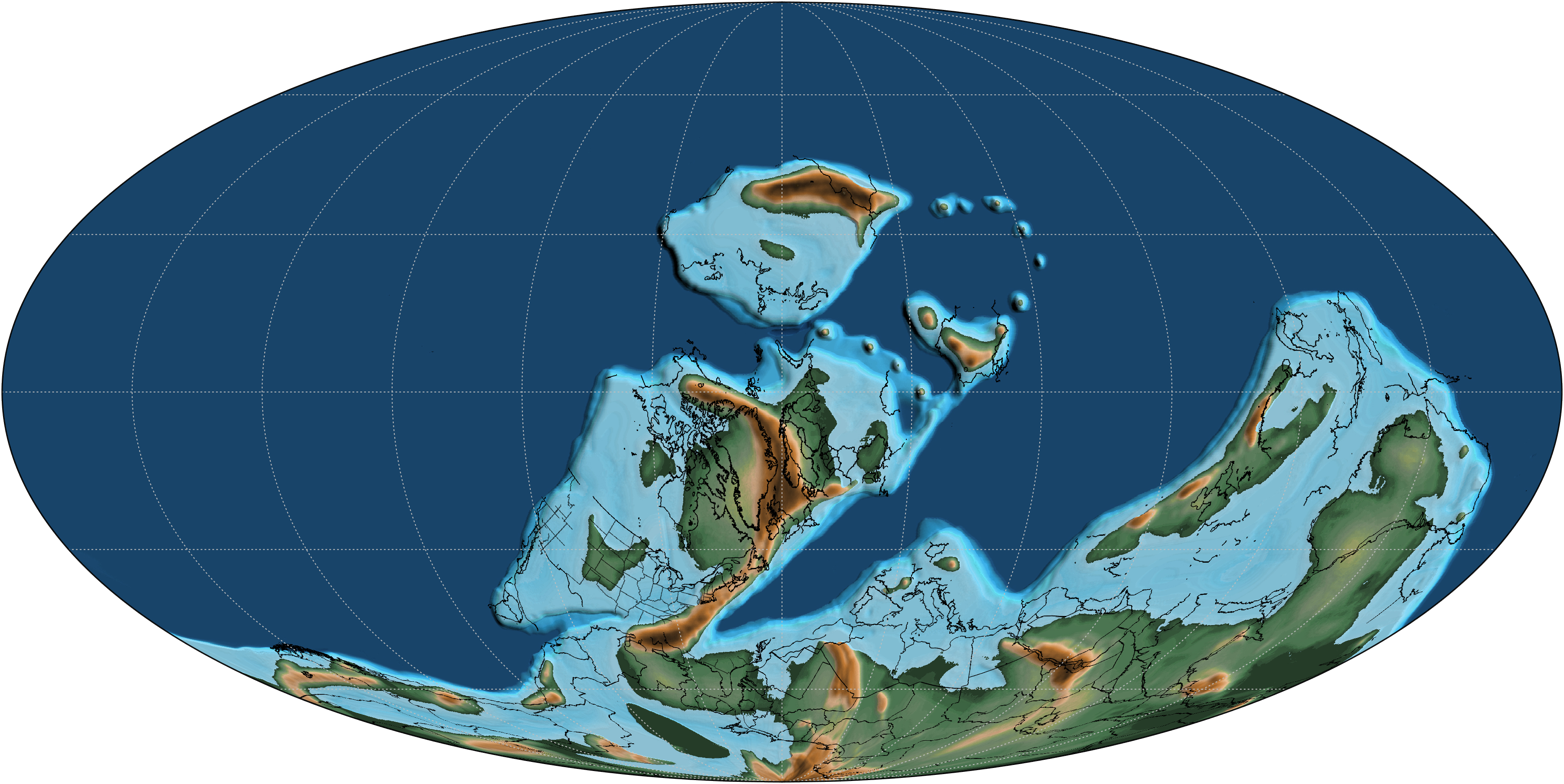
Map of Earth during the Devonian around 390 Ma

Gondwana and Laurasia formed the Pangaea supercontinent during the Carboniferous. Pangaea began to break up in the Mid-Jurassic when the Central Atlantic opened.

In the western end of Pangaea, the collision between Gondwana and Laurasia closed the Rheic and Paleo-Tethys oceans. The obliquity of this closure resulted in the docking of some northern terranes in the Marathon, Ouachita, Alleghanian, and Variscan orogenies, respectively. Southern terranes, such as Chortis and Oaxaca, on the other hand, remained largely unaffected by the collision along the southern shores of Laurentia. Some Peri-Gondwanan terranes, such as Yucatán and Florida, were buffered from collisions by major promontories. Other terranes, such as Carolina and Meguma, were directly involved in the collision. The final collision resulted in the Variscan-Appalachian Mountains, stretching from present-day Mexico to southern Europe. Meanwhile, Baltica collided with Siberia and Kazakhstania which resulted in the Uralian orogeny and Laurasia. Pangaea was finally amalgamated in the Late Carboniferous-Early Permian, but the oblique forces continued until Pangaea began to rift in the Triassic.

In the eastern end, collisions occurred slightly later. The North China, South China, and Indochina blocks rifted from Gondwana during the middle Paleozoic and opened the Proto-Tethys Ocean. North China docked with Mongolia and Siberia during the Carboniferous–Permian, followed by South China. The Cimmerian blocks then rifted from Gondwana to form the Paleo-Tethys and Neo-Tethys oceans in the Late Carboniferous, and docked with Asia during the Triassic and Jurassic. Western Pangaea began to rift while the eastern end was still being assembled.

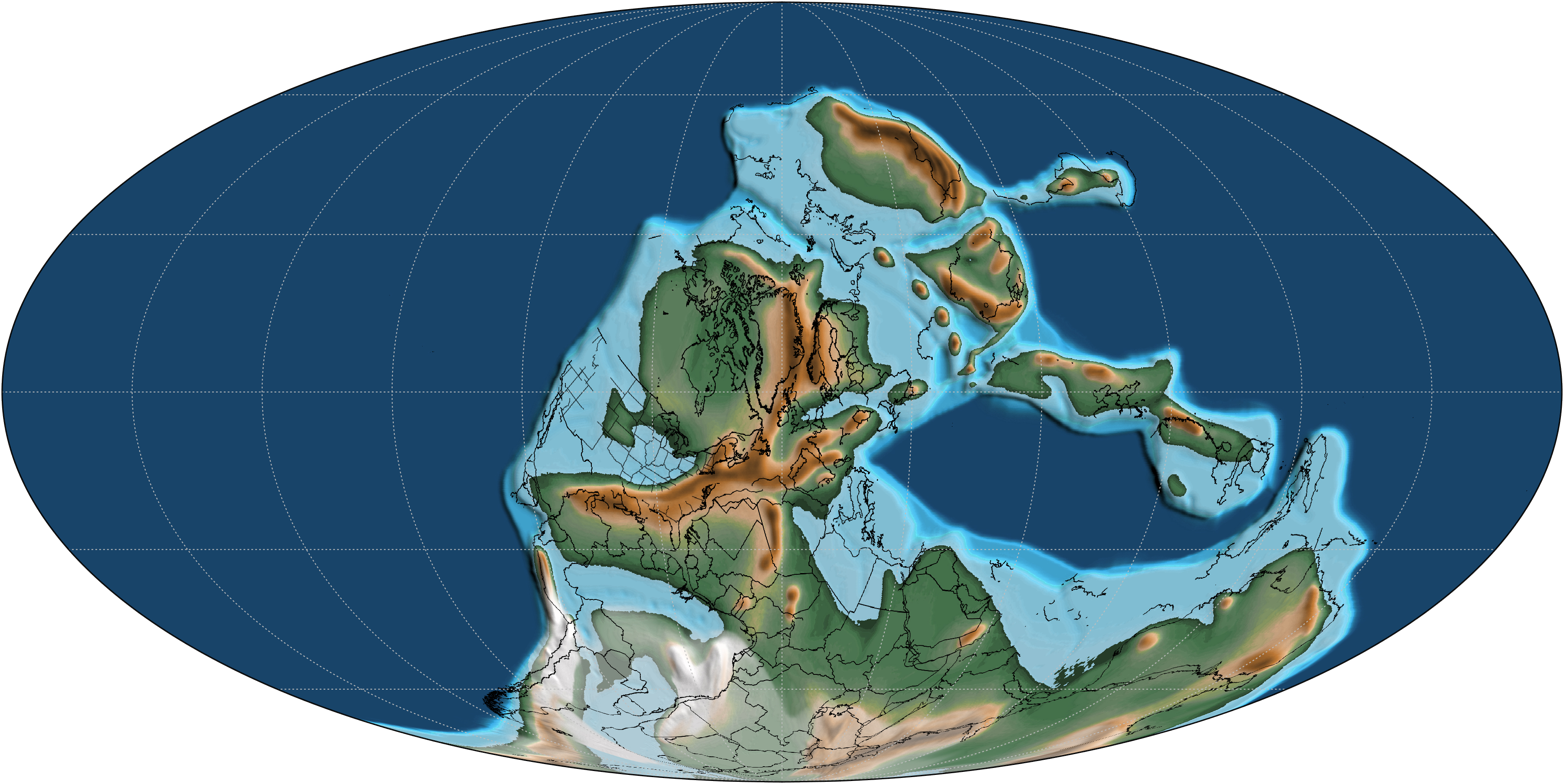
Map of Earth during Carboniferous c. 330 Ma

The formation of Pangaea and its mountains had a tremendous impact on global climate and sea levels, which resulted in glaciations and continent-wide sedimentation. In North America, the base of the Absaroka sequence coincides with the Alleghanian and Ouachita orogenies and are indicative of a large-scale change in the mode of deposition far away from the Pangaean orogenies. Ultimately, these changes contributed to the Permian–Triassic extinction event and left large deposits of hydrocarbons, coal, evaporite, and metals.

The breakup of Pangaea began with the Central Atlantic magmatic province (CAMP) between South America, Africa, North America, and Europe. CAMP covered more than seven million square kilometres over a few million years, reached its peak at c. 200 Ma, and coincided with the Triassic–Jurassic extinction event. The reformed Gondwanan continent was not precisely the same as that which had existed before Pangaea formed; for example, most of Florida and southern Georgia and Alabama is underlain by rocks that were originally part of Gondwana, but this region stayed attached to North America when the Central Atlantic opened.

== Break-up ==
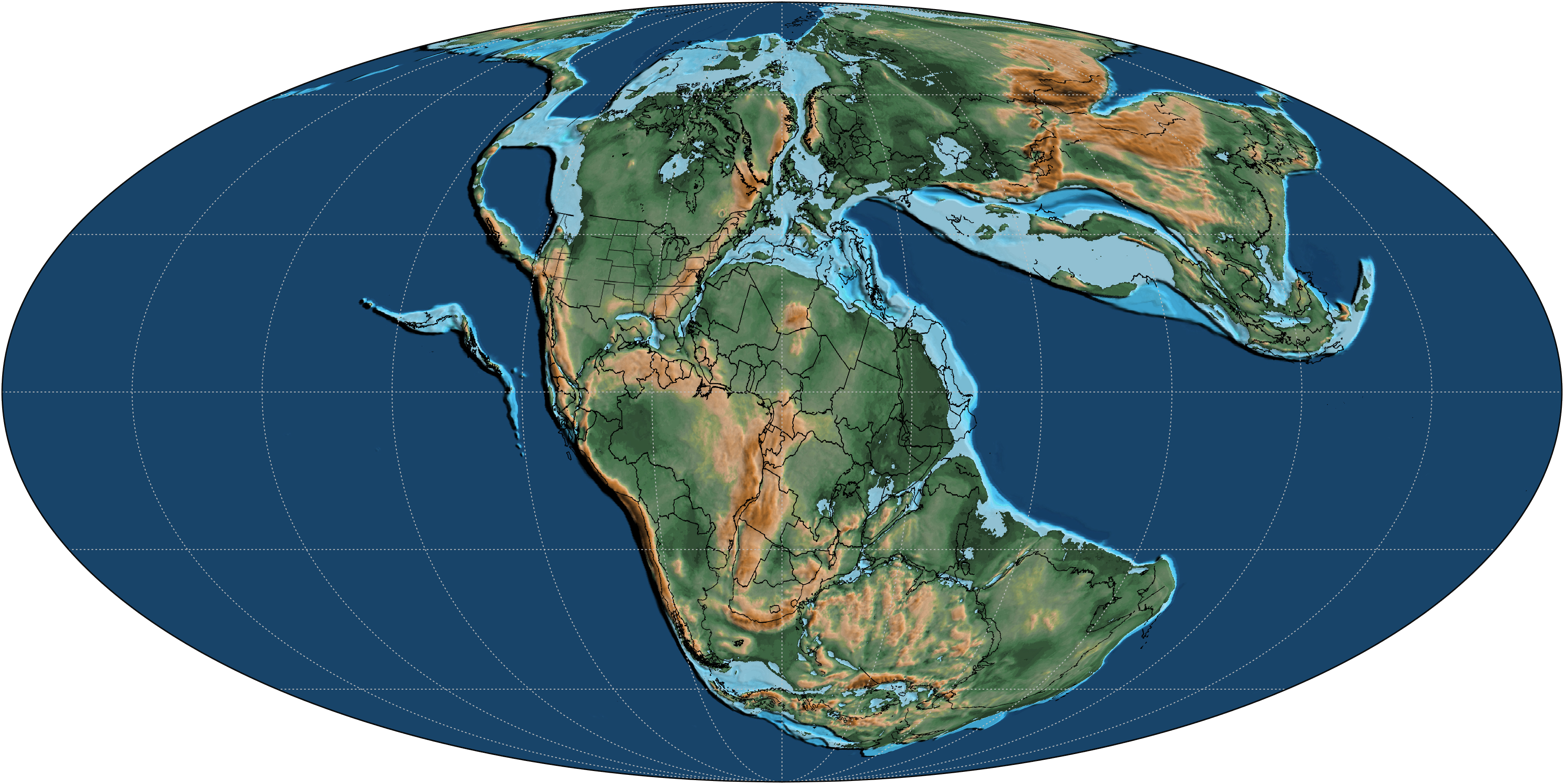
Map of Pangaea during the Early Jurassic c. 190 Ma

=== Mesozoic ===
Antarctica, the centre of the supercontinent, shared boundaries with all other Gondwana continents and the fragmentation of Gondwana propagated clockwise around it. The break-up was the result of the eruption of the Karoo-Ferrar igneous province, one of the Earth's most extensive large igneous provinces (LIP) c. 200 to 170 Ma, but the oldest magnetic anomalies between South America, Africa, and Antarctica are found in what is now the southern Weddell Sea where initial break-up occurred during the Jurassic c. 180 to 160 Ma.

==== Opening of western Indian Ocean ====
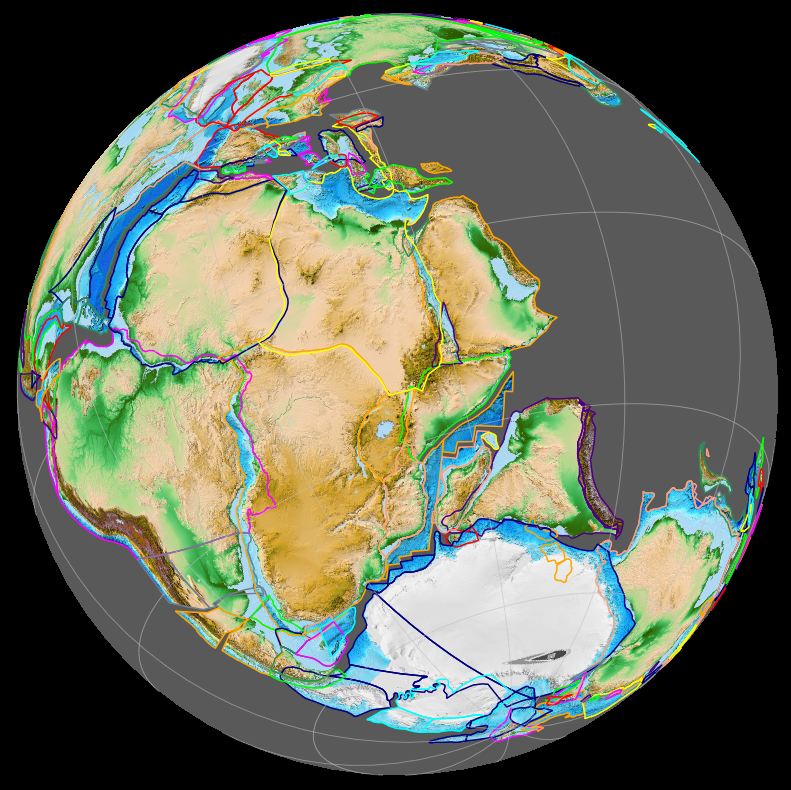
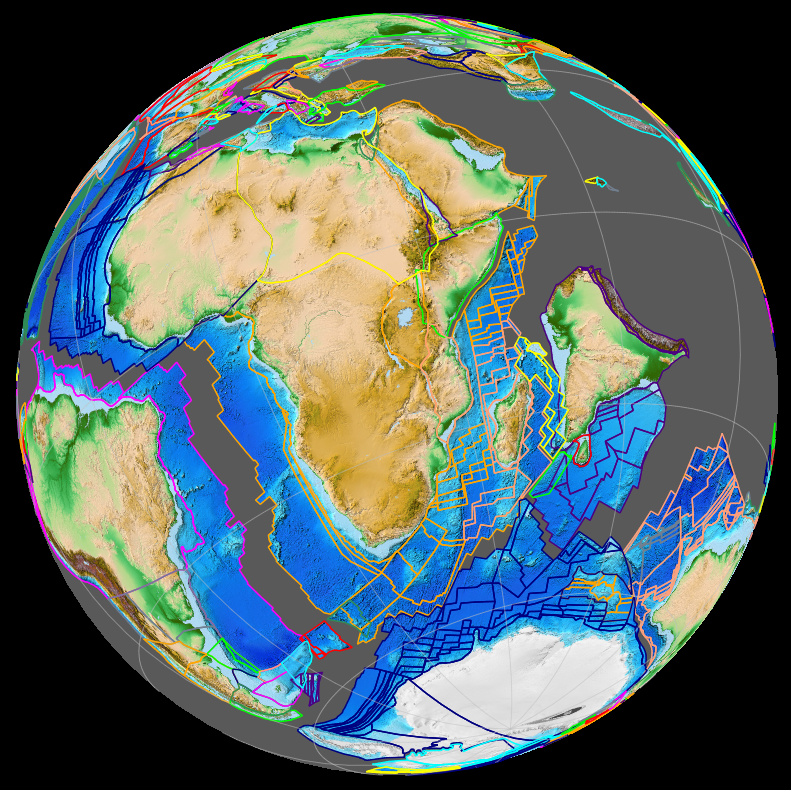
The oldest western Indian ocean floor formed between Madagascar and Africa c. 150 Ma (left) and between India and Madagascar c. 70 Ma (right).

Gondwana began to break up in the early Jurassic following the extensive and fast emplacement of the Karoo-Ferrar flood basalts c. 184 Ma. Before the Karoo plume initiated rifting between Africa and Antarctica, it separated a series of smaller continental blocks from Gondwana's southern, Proto-Pacific margin (along what is now the Transantarctic Mountains): the Antarctic Peninsula, Marie Byrd Land, Zealandia, and Thurston Island; the Falkland Islands and Ellsworth–Whitmore Mountains (in Antarctica) were rotated 90° in opposite directions; and South America south of the Gastre Fault (often referred to as Patagonia) was pushed westward. The history of the Africa-Antarctica break-up can be studied in great detail in the fracture zones and magnetic anomalies flanking the Southwest Indian Ridge.

The Madagascar block and the Mascarene Plateau, stretching from the Seychelles to Réunion, were broken off India, causing Madagascar and Insular India to be separate landmasses: elements of this break-up nearly coincide with the Cretaceous–Paleogene extinction event. The India–Madagascar–Seychelles separations appear to coincide with the eruption of the Deccan basalts, whose eruption site may survive as the Réunion hotspot. The Seychelles and the Maldives are now separated by the Central Indian Ridge.

During the initial break-up in the Early Jurassic, a marine transgression swept over the Horn of Africa covering Triassic planation surfaces with sandstone, limestone, shale, marls and evaporites.

==== Opening of eastern Indian Ocean ====
During the Late Triassic and Jurassic, several terranes, including the West Burma block, the Lhasa Terrane, and several terranes variously referred to as "Argoland", are suggested to have rifted off the northern coast of Eastern Gondwana (what is now the Indian subcontinent and Australia), later colliding with Asia during the Cretaceous and Cenozoic.

Video of paleogeographic reconstructions from Advokaat and van Hinsbergen 2024, demonstrating rifting of various terranes of Eastern Gondwana during the Late Triassic-Jurassic and their collision with Asia during the Cretaceous and Cenozoic

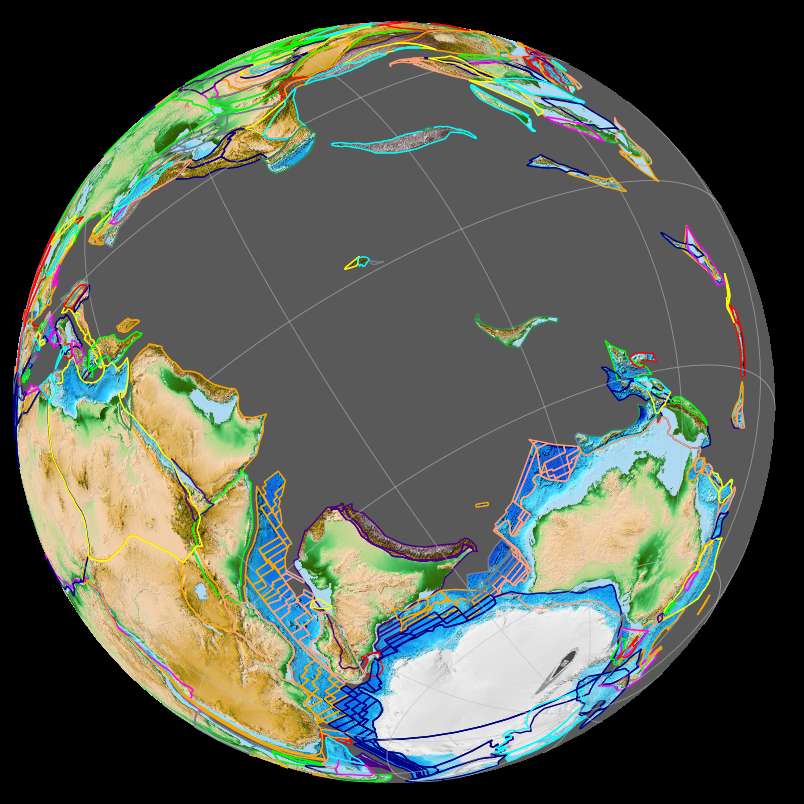
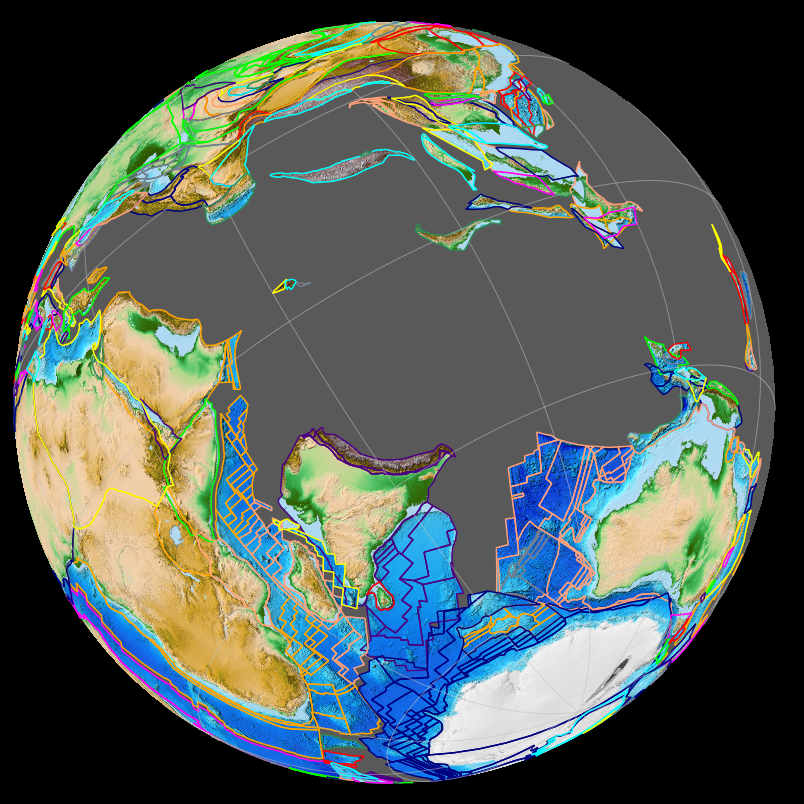
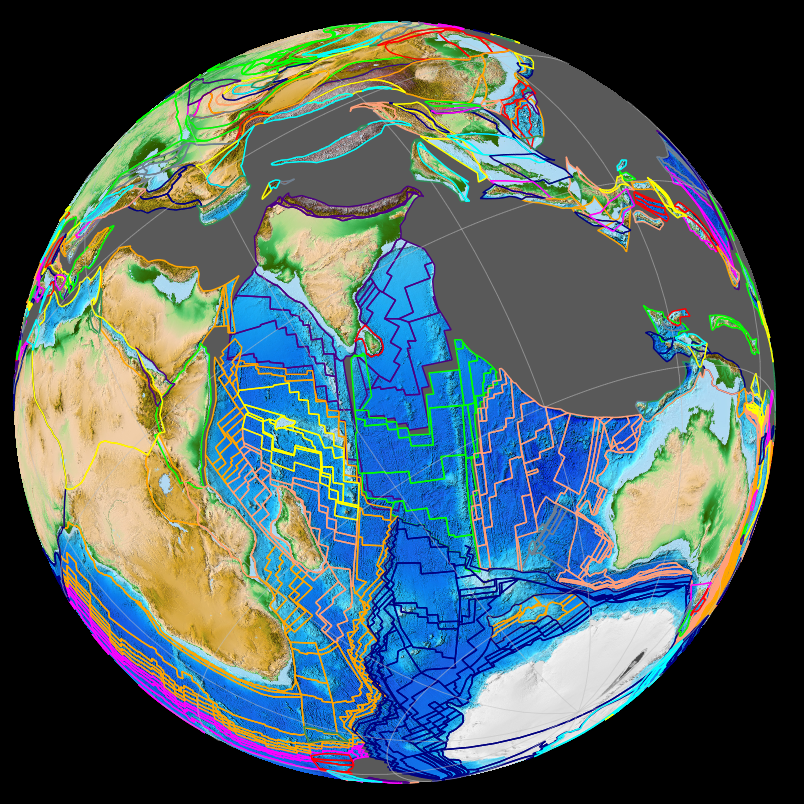
The oldest eastern Indian ocean floor formed between India and Antarctica c. 120 Ma (left). The Kerguelen LIP began to form the Ninety East ridge c. 80 Ma (centre). The Indian and Australian plates merged c. 40 Ma (right).

East Gondwana, comprising Antarctica, Madagascar, India, and Australia, began to separate from Africa. East Gondwana then began to break up c. 132.5 to 96 Ma when India moved northwest from Australia-Antarctica. The Indian plate and the Australian plate are now separated by the Capricorn plate and its diffuse boundaries. During the opening of the Indian Ocean, the Kerguelen hotspot first formed the Kerguelen Plateau on the Antarctic plate c. 118 to 95 Ma and then the Ninety East Ridge on the Indian plate at c. 100 Ma. The Kerguelen Plateau and the Broken Ridge, the southern end of the Ninety East Ridge, are now separated by the Southeast Indian Ridge.

Separation between Australia and East Antarctica began c. 132 Ma with seafloor spreading occurring c. 96 Ma. A shallow seaway developed over the South Tasman Rise during the Early Cenozoic and as oceanic crust started to separate the continents during the Eocene c. 35.5 Ma global ocean temperature dropped significantly. A dramatic shift from arc- to rift magmatism c. 100 Ma separated Zealandia, including New Zealand, the Campbell Plateau, Chatham Rise, Lord Howe Rise, Norfolk Ridge, and New Caledonia, from West Antarctica c. 84 Ma.

==== Opening of South Atlantic Ocean ====
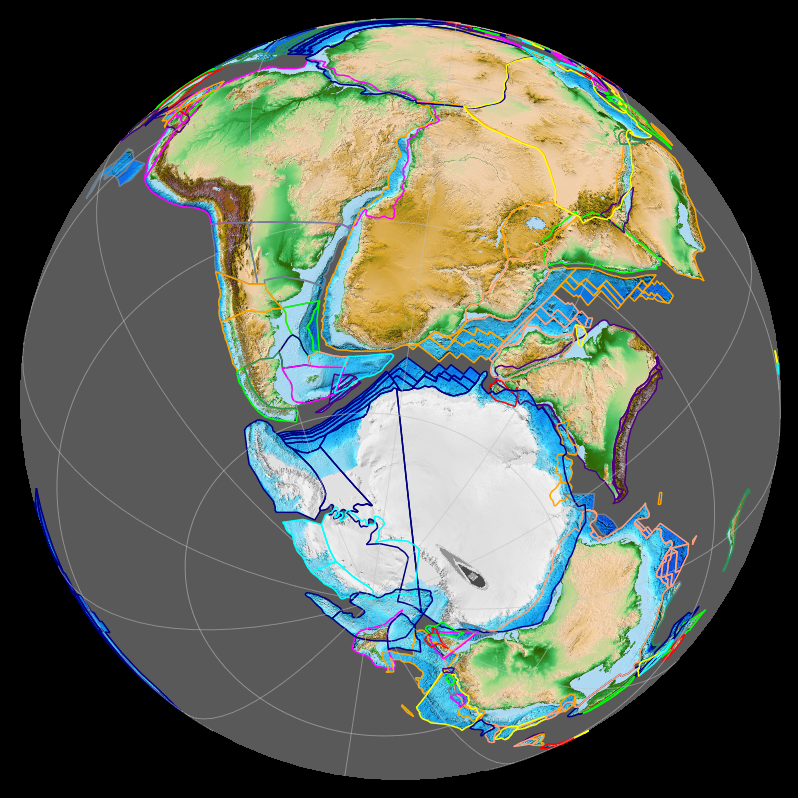
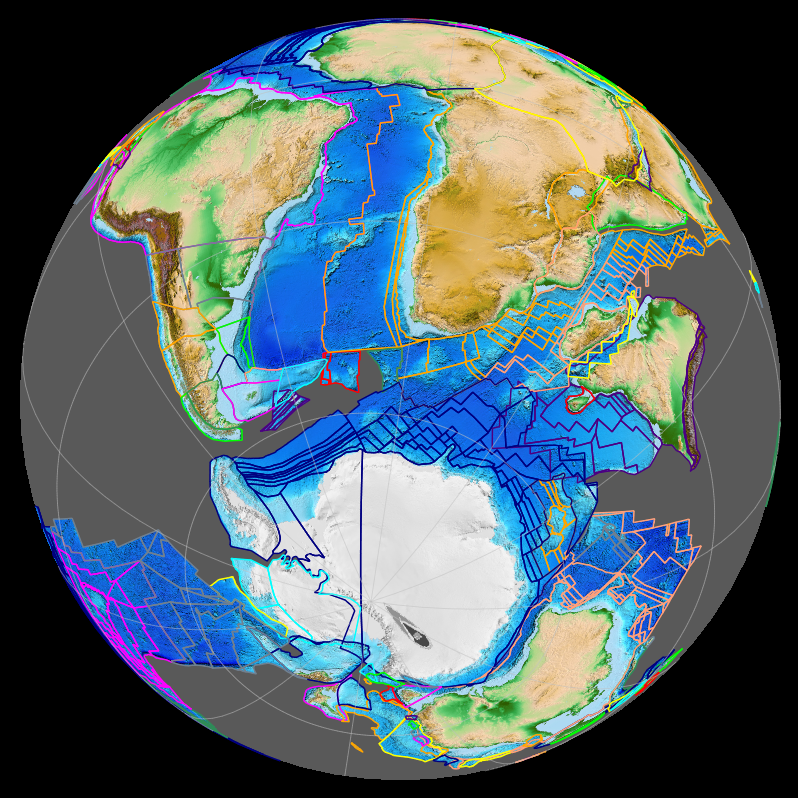
At c. 126 Ma (left) the Falkland Plateau began to slide past southern Africa and the Paraná-Etendeka LIP had opened the Mid-Atlantic Ridge. At c. 83 Ma (right) the South Atlantic was fully opened and the Romanche Fracture Zone was forming near the Equator.

The opening of the South Atlantic Ocean divided West Gondwana (South America and Africa), but there is considerable debate over the exact timing of this break-up. Rifting propagated from south to north along Triassic–Early Jurassic lineaments, but intra-continental rifts also began to develop within both continents in Jurassic–Cretaceous sedimentary basins, subdividing each continent into three sub-plates. Rifting began c. 190 Ma at Falkland latitudes, forcing Patagonia to move relative to the still static remainder of South America and Africa, and this westward movement lasted until the Early Cretaceous 126.7 Ma. From there rifting propagated northward during the Late Jurassic c. 150 Ma or Early Cretaceous c. 140 Ma most likely forcing dextral movements between sub-plates on either side. South of the Walvis Ridge and Rio Grande Rise the Paraná and Etendeka magmatics resulted in further ocean-floor spreading c. 130 to 135 Ma and the development of rifts systems on both continents, including the Central African Rift System and the Central African Shear Zone which lasted until c. 85 Ma. At Brazilian latitudes spreading is more difficult to assess because of the lack of palaeo-magnetic data, but rifting occurred in Nigeria at the Benue Trough c. 118 Ma. North of the Equator the rifting began after 120.4 Ma and continued until c. 100 to 96 Ma. Dinosaur footprints representing identical species assemblages are known from opposite sides of the South Atlantic (Brazil and Cameroon) dating to around 120 million years ago, suggesting that some form of land connection still existed between Africa and South America as recently as the early Aptian.

==== Early Andean orogeny ====
The first phases of Andean orogeny in the Jurassic and Early Cretaceous were characterised by extensional tectonics, rifting, the development of back-arc basins and the emplacement of large batholiths. This development is presumed to have been linked to the subduction of cold oceanic lithosphere. During the mid to Late Cretaceous (c. 90 million years ago), the Andean orogeny changed significantly in character. Warmer and younger oceanic lithosphere is believed to have started to be subducted beneath South America around this time. Such kind of subduction is held responsible not only for the intense contractional deformation that different lithologies were subject to, but also the uplift and erosion known to have occurred from the Late Cretaceous onward. Plate tectonic reorganisation since the mid-Cretaceous might also have been linked to the opening of the South Atlantic Ocean. Another change related to mid-Cretaceous plate tectonic rearrangement was the change of subduction direction of the oceanic lithosphere that went from having south-east motion to having a north-east motion about 90 million years ago. While subduction direction changed, it remained oblique (and not perpendicular) to the coast of South America, and the direction change affected several subduction zone-parallel faults including Atacama, Domeyko and Liquiñe-Ofqui.

=== Cenozoic ===
Insular India began to collide with Asia circa 70 Ma, forming the Indian subcontinent, since which more than 1,400 km (870 mi) of crust has been absorbed by the Himalayan-Tibetan orogen. During the Cenozoic, the orogen resulted in the construction of the Tibetan Plateau between the Tethyan Himalayas in the south and the Kunlun and Qilian mountains in the north.

Later, South America was connected to North America via the Isthmus of Panama, cutting off a circulation of warm water and thereby making the Arctic colder, as well as allowing the Great American Interchange.

The break-up of Gondwana can be said to continue in eastern Africa at the Afar triple junction, which separates the Arabian, African, and Somali plates, resulting in rifting in the Red Sea and East African Rift.

==== Australia–Antarctica separation ====
In the Early Cenozoic, Australia was still connected to Antarctica c. 35–40° south of its current location and both continents were largely unglaciated. This was one end of the Antarctic land bridge, the other connecting Antarctica to South America. A rift between the two developed but remained an embayment until the Eocene-Oligocene boundary when the Circumpolar Current developed and the glaciation of Antarctica began.

Australia was warm and wet during the Paleocene and dominated by rainforests. The opening of the Tasman Gateway at the Eocene-Oligocene boundary (33 Ma) resulted in abrupt cooling but the Oligocene became a period of high rainfall with swamps in southeastern Australia. During the Miocene, a warm and humid climate developed with pockets of rainforests in central Australia, but before the end of the period, colder and drier climate severely reduced this rainforest. A brief period of increased rainfall in the Pliocene was followed by drier climate which favoured grassland. Since then, the fluctuation between wet interglacial periods and dry glacial periods has developed into the present arid regime. Australia has thus experienced various climate changes over a 15-million-year period with a gradual decrease in precipitation.

The Tasman Gateway between Australia and Antarctica began to open c. 40 to 30 Ma. Palaeontological evidence indicates the Antarctic Circumpolar Current (ACC) was established in the Late Oligocene c. 23 Ma with the full opening of the Drake Passage and the deepening of the Tasman Gateway. The oldest oceanic crust in the Drake Passage, however, is 34 to 29 Ma-old which indicates that the spreading between the Antarctic and South American plates began near the Eocene-Oligocene boundary. Deep sea environments in Tierra del Fuego and the North Scotia Ridge during the Eocene and Oligocene indicate a "Proto-ACC" opened during this period. Later, 26 to 14 Ma, a series of events severally restricted the Proto-ACC: change to shallow marine conditions along the North Scotia Ridge; closure of the Fuegan Seaway, the deep sea that existed in Tierra del Fuego; and uplift of the Patagonian Cordillera. This, together with the reactivated Iceland plume, contributed to global warming. During the Miocene, the Drake Passage began to widen, and as water flow between South America and the Antarctic Peninsula increased, the renewed ACC resulted in cooler global climate.

Since the Eocene, the northward movement of the Australian Plate has resulted in an arc-continent collision with the Philippine and Caroline plates and the uplift of the New Guinea Highlands. From the Oligocene to the late Miocene, the climate in Australia, dominated by warm and humid rainforests before this collision, began to alternate between open forest and rainforest before the continent became the arid or semiarid landscape it is today.

== Biogeography ==
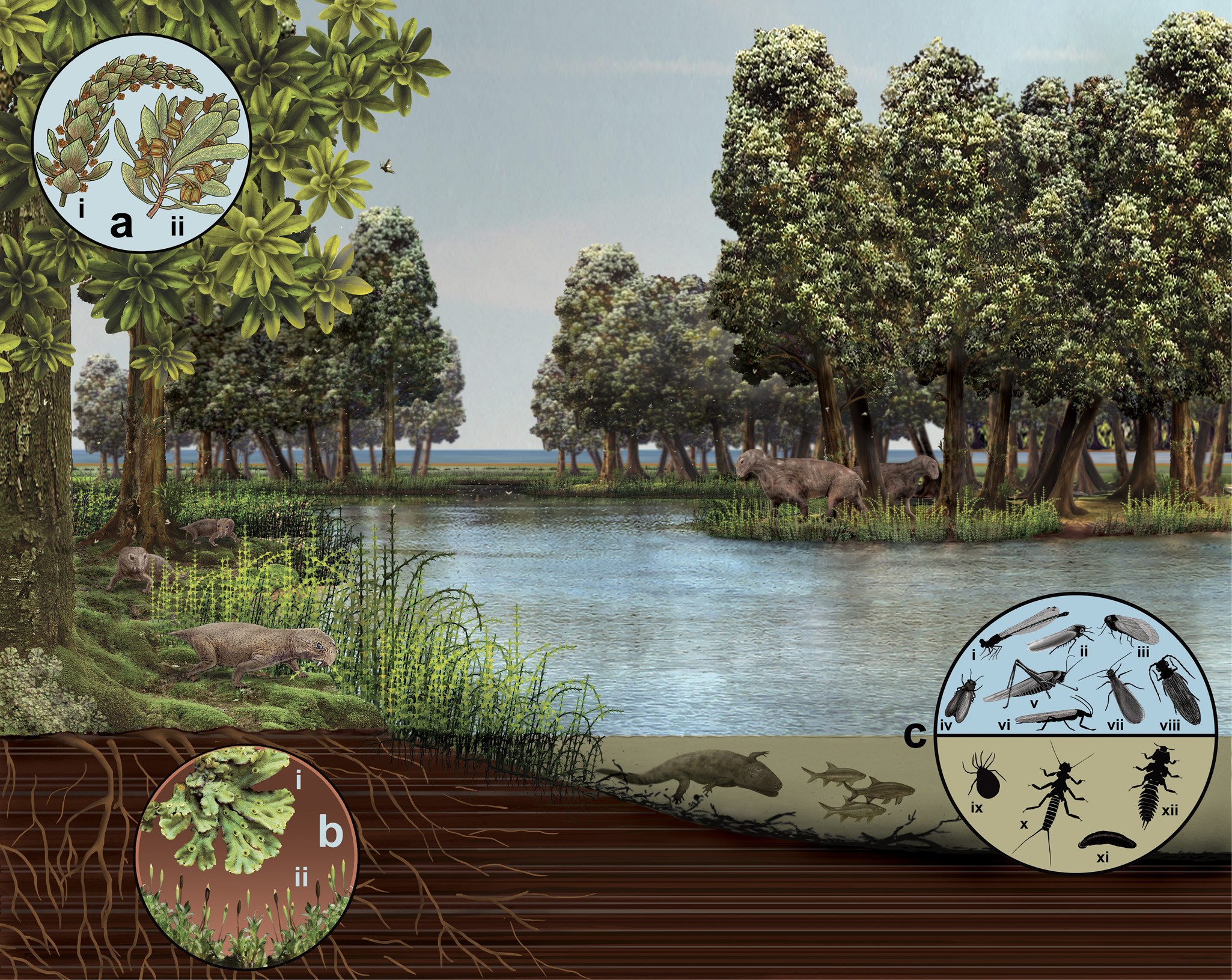
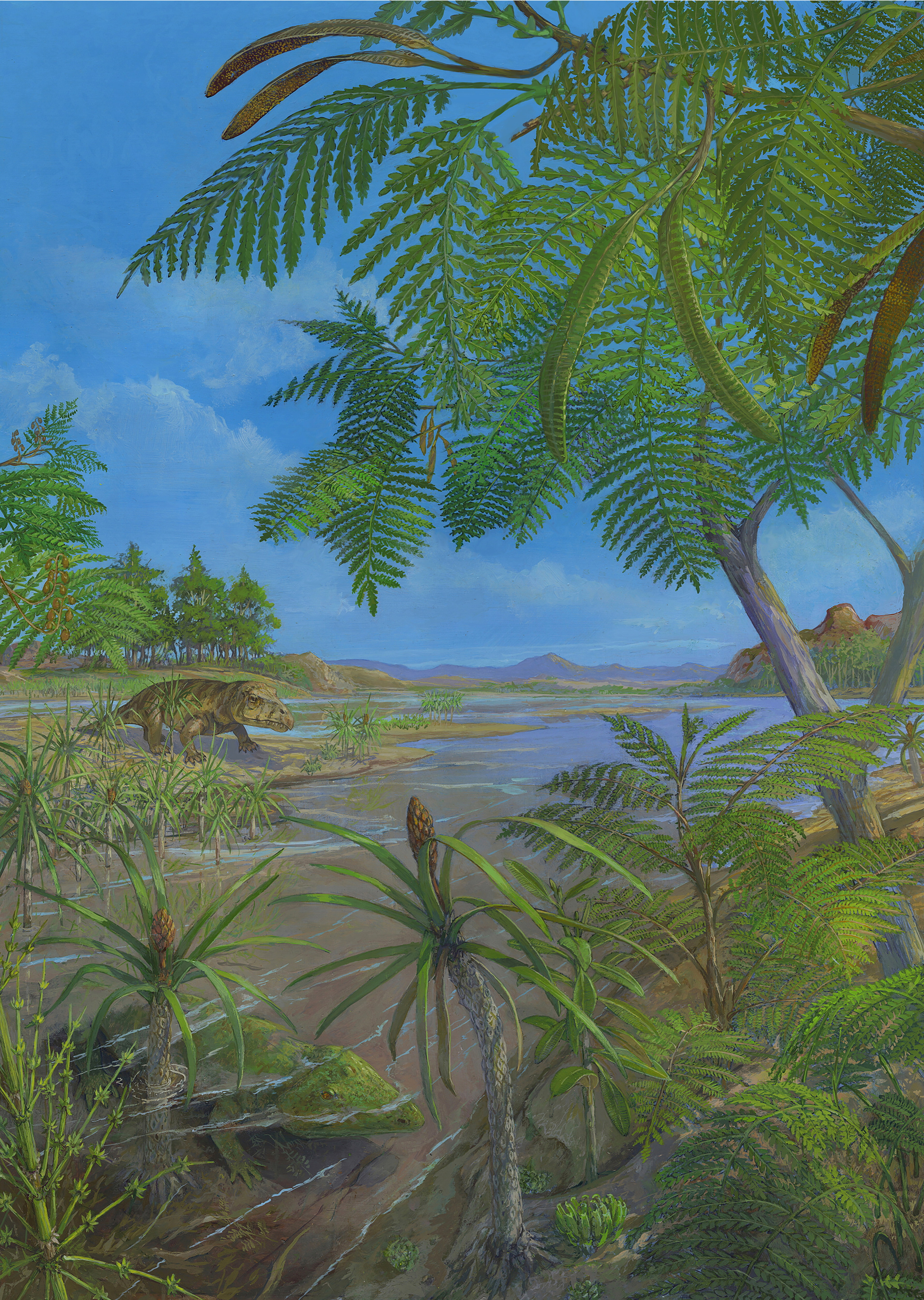
Permian South African landscape featuring trees of Glossopteris (left/top) and Triassic Australian landscape featuring a Dicroidium tree (right/bottom, upper right). Glossopteris and Dicroidium were widespread across Gondwana during these respective periods.

The adjective "Gondwanan" is in common use in biogeography when referring to patterns of distribution of living organisms, typically when the organisms are restricted to two or more of the now-discontinuous regions that were once part of Gondwana, including the Antarctic flora. Gondwana was colonised by primitive land plants such as Baragwanathia by the early Silurian. During the Late Devonian, like elsewhere, coastal areas of Gondwana were colonised by large Archaeopteris trees. During the Permian period following the fusion with Pangaea, large parts of southern Gondwana were dominated by glossopterid trees, particularly Glossopteris, until these ecosystems collapsed in the end-Permian mass extinction event. During the Triassic, large parts of Gondwana were dominated by trees belonging to the genus Dicroidium, which had fern-like leaves, until these ecosystems also collapsed during the end-Triassic extinction event. During the Jurassic, Gondwanan ecosystems were dominated by conifers and members of the extinct seed plant order Bennettitales. The Cretaceous saw the rise of flowering plants (angiosperms) across Gondwana and the decline of the gymnosperms, coinciding with Gondwana's fragmentation. Towards the end of the Cretaceous, the angiosperm tree Nothofagus emerged in southern parts of the former Gondwana adjacent to and including Antarctica, where it rose to a prominent position in temperate forest ecosystems. Nothofagus still holds a prominent position in temperate forests in these regions today outside of Antarctica as part of the "Antarctic flora".

== See also ==
- Continental drift, the movement of the Earth's continents relative to each other
- Australasian realm
- Gondwana Rainforests of Australia
- The Great Escarpment of Southern Africa
- Plate tectonics, a theory which describes the large-scale motions of Earth's lithosphere
- South Polar dinosaurs, which proliferated during the Early Cretaceous (145–100 Mya) while Australia was still linked to Antarctica to form East Gondwana
- Gondwana Research, a scholarly journal including Gondwana among its emphases
