= Samfrau Orogeny =

The Samfrau Geosyncline or Samfrau Orogeny is an orogenic belt that was active in the Palaeozoic and early Mesozoic in Gondwanaland, formed by small terranes and deep accumulations of old sediment dumped off the continent's edge by erosion, accreting against the Pacific-side coast of Gondwanaland due to subduction. Its name (as "Samfrau Geosyncline") was coined by Alexander du Toit. Parts of it exist now in northern Argentina, South Africa, Antarctica, and part of the east coast region of Australia, as shown in this map.
