= East Antarctic Shield =

Cratonic rock body which makes up most of the continent Antarctica

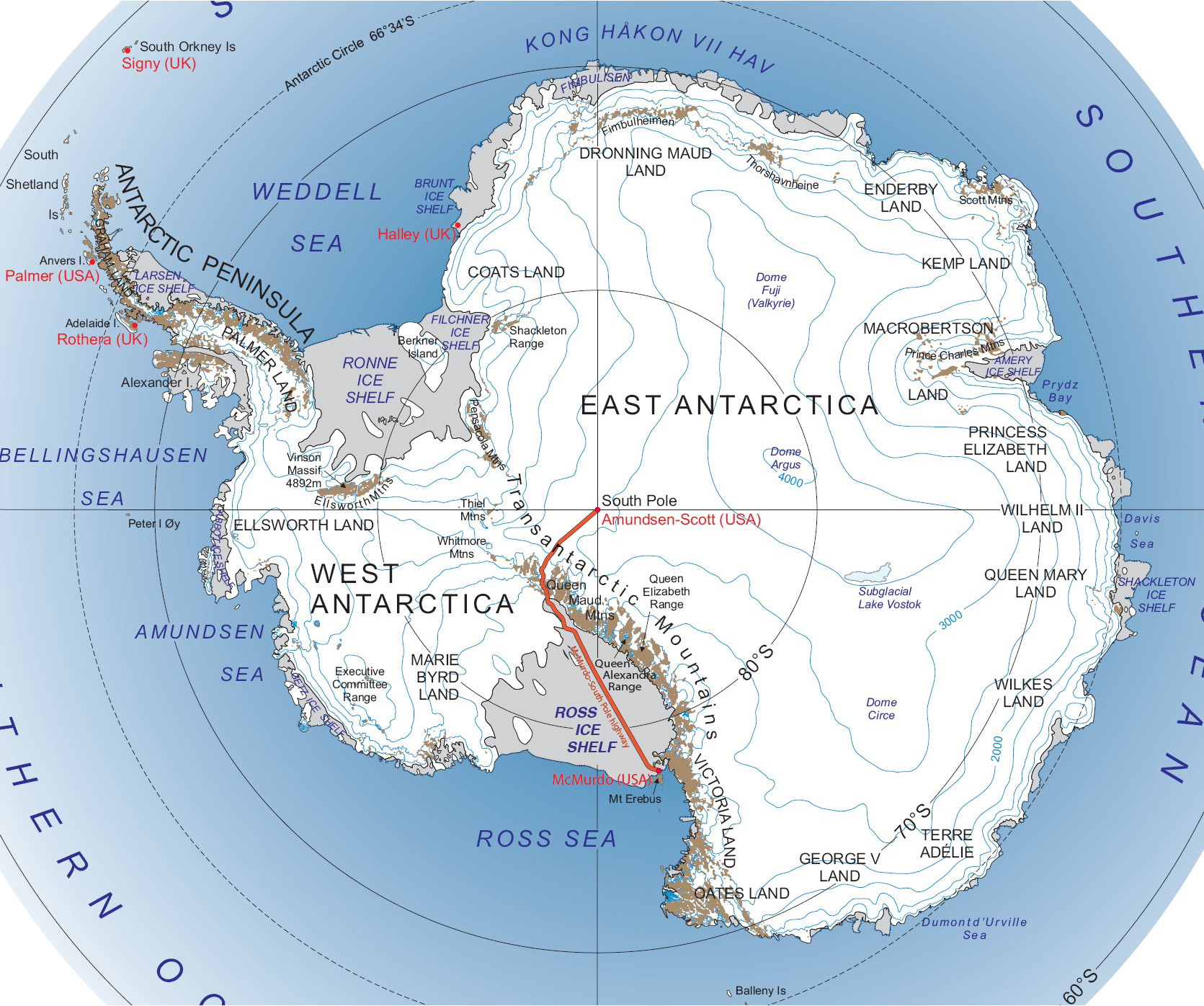
Figure 1. Map of East and West Antarctica separated by the Transantarctic Mountain Range

The East Antarctic Shield or Craton is a cratonic rock body that covers 10.2 million square kilometers or roughly 73% of the continent of Antarctica. The shield is almost entirely buried by the East Antarctic Ice Sheet that has an average thickness of 2200 meters but reaches up to 4700 meters in some locations. East Antarctica is separated from West Antarctica by the 100–300 kilometer wide Transantarctic Mountains, which span nearly 3,500 kilometers from the Weddell Sea to the Ross Sea. The East Antarctic Shield is then divided into an extensive central craton (Mawson craton) that occupies most of the continental interior and various other marginal cratons that are exposed along the coast.

== Background ==
The blue line represents the path traveled by the East Antarctic Shield over the past 550 million years. Red numbers indicate the time (millions of years ago); the yellow dot represents the south pole.

Over the past 1 billion years, East Antarctica has traveled from tropical (to subtropical) southerly latitudes to its current location with the entire East Antarctic Shield positioned south of the Antarctic Circle. Despite its relative lack of motion over the past 75 million years, the East Antarctic Shield has played a significant role in the arrangement and motion of its surrounding plates during the amalgamation and separation of the supercontinents, Rodinia, Gondwana, and Pangea. Because the surface of the shield is covered by ice and therefore not directly accessible, the information about its tectonic history comes primarily from seismic and core-sample data. Geologists have used this data to define the rock types present, age the rocks using radioactive dating techniques, unveil the climate history from isotope ratios, and trace the shield's motion based on varying magnetic properties. Unfortunately, there are only a few places where data can be collected directly from the basement rock, and even at these locations, the exposed areas of the central craton can be misleading due to factors such as reworking during high-grade late Neoproterozoic to Cambrian deformation, variable overprinting by Cambrian tectonics, and the presence of younger metasediments. However, it has been determined that the East Antarctic Shield has a Precambrian to Ordovician basement of igneous and sedimentary rocks that are deformed and metamorphosed to varying degrees, and intruded by syn- to post-tectonic granites. The basement is locally overlain by undeformed Devonian to Jurassic sediments, and intruded by Jurassic tholeiitic plutonic and volcanic rocks. This knowledge of the shield's structural features and compositions leads to the development of a tectonic history. The traditional models of East Antarctic Shield geology typically involve a three-stage tectonic history that includes:

- the stabilization of various Archean to Paleoproterozoic cratons before 1600 Ma
- the development of a high-grade late Mesoproterozoic to early Neoproterozoic (1300-900 Ma) mobile belt that roughly follows the modern coast of East Antarctica, and
- low- to high-grade late Neoproterozoic to Ordovician (550-450 Ma) tectonism in the Ross orogen, situated at the present-day Transantarctic Mountains, coupled with a static thermal overprint in much of the craton interior.

In 2026 the discovery of a new physiographic unit by Italian scientific investigations was called the "East Antarctic Fan-Shaped Basin Province" and has generated novel tectonic theories.

== Interaction with supercontinents ==
=== Rodinia: 1100–750 Ma ===
East Antarctica comprises Archean and Proterozoic-Cambrian terranes that amalgamated during Precambrian and Cambrian times. In the time of the supercontinent Rodinia, western Australia and East Antarctica were linked by the two-stage Albany-Fraser-Wilkes orogen, which occurred between 1350 and 1260 Ma and 1210-1140 Ma, and also the older, Mawson craton. It is estimated that Rodinia formed between 1100 Ma and 1000 Ma. During this time, there was tectonism occurring from Coats Land to the Windmill Islands of East Antarctica. This was taken as evidence for a continuous, late Mesoproterozoic to early Neoproterozoic mobile belt skirting across the coast of the East Antarctic Shield. This Grenville-age belt is commonly called the Wegener-Mawson Mobile Belt, or the Circum East Antarctic Mobile Belt, and can be extended to formerly adjacent continents. The Maud Province correlates with the Namaqua-Natal Province of South Africa. Rocks in the Rayner Complex and northern Prince Charles Mountains are an extension of the Eastern Ghats of India. Lastly, relationships in the Bunger Hills-Windmill Islands correspond closely to those in the Albany-Fraser Orogen of western Australia. This region of Grenville-age tectonism is interpreted as a suture between the Central Antarctic-South Australian craton (the Mawson continent) and the marginal cratons that make up most of southern Africa, India and western Australia. This tectonism continued until 900 Ma and by 750 Ma, the supercontinent Rodinia had begun to break up. The rupture might have resulted from the opening of an equatorial ocean basin between West Laurentia and West Australia-East Antarctica.

=== Gondwana: 550–320 Ma ===
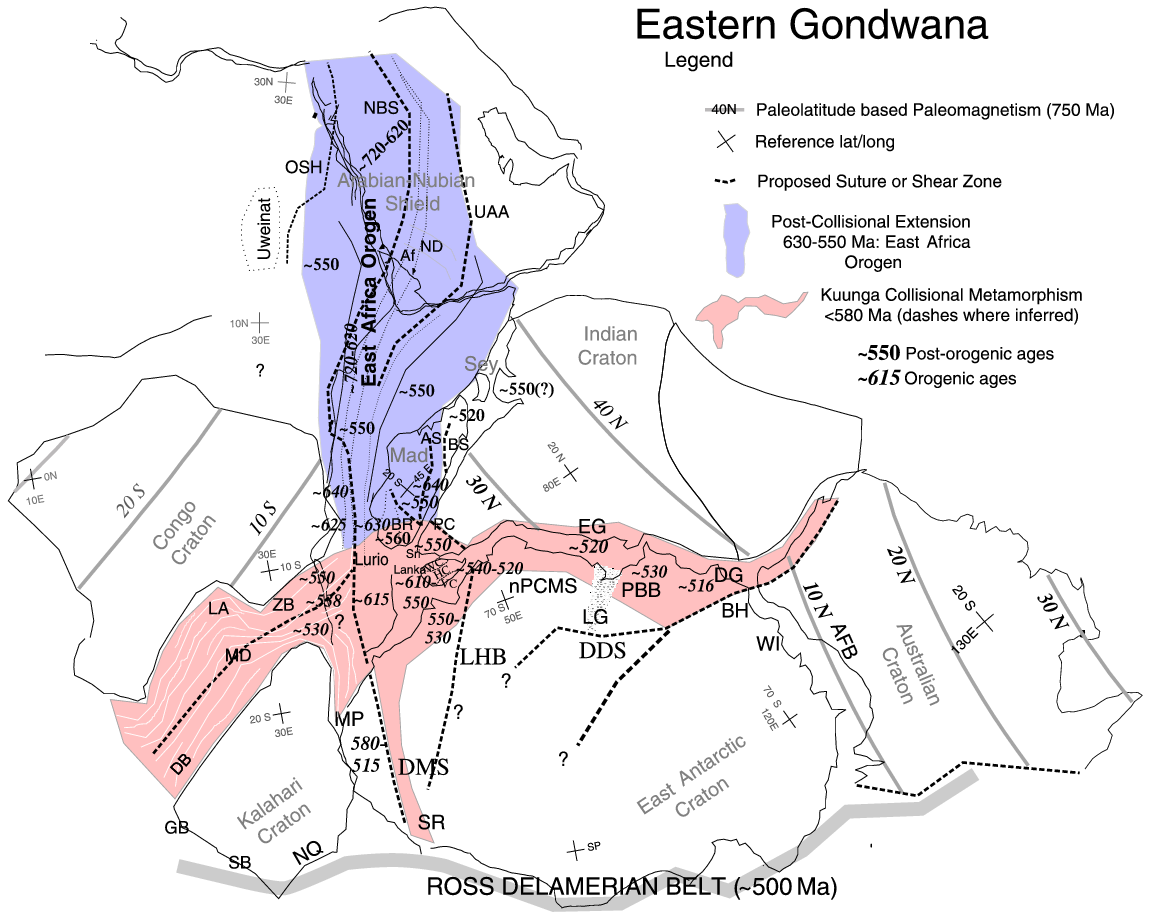
The configuration of the continents during the time of Gondwana. The location of the Pan-African Orogeny, Lutzow Holm belt and many other features caused by the interaction between the East Antarctic Shield and the surrounding plates.

Then came Gondwana. The amalgamation of East and West Gondwana occurred by the closure of the Mozambique Ocean. This collision occurred between 700 and 500 Ma and resulted in the East African Orogeny. The protracted Pan-African tectonic period was one of the most spectacular mountain building episodes in Earth's history. Gondwana incorporated all of Africa, Madagascar, Seychelles, Arabia, India and East Antarctica along with most of South America and Australia. In the late Cambrian, Gondwana stretched from polar (NW Africa) to subtropical southerly latitudes with East Antarctica around the equator. The Pan-African orogenies that stabilized the East Antarctic Shield took place in two main zones; a broad region between the Shackleton Mountain Range, caused by the collision with South Africa, and India, and along the Transantarctic Mountains (Ross Orogeny).

The Ross Orogen comprises a deformed sequence of Neoproterozoic to Cambrian sediments. These sediments were deposited at a passive margin that likely developed during the rifting of North America from the East Antarctic Shield, and were subsequently deformed and metamorphosed at a low- to medium-grade and intruded by syn- and post-tectonic granitoids. Plutonism and metamorphism commenced at about 550 Ma with peak metamorphism at 540-535 Ma. At this time, two more high-grade Cambrian mobile belts formed in East Antarctica, the Lutzow Holm Belt and the Prydz Belt. Tectonism was relatively synchronous between the two from 550 to 515 Ma and both belts overprinted late Mesoproterozoic to early Neoproterozoic, Grenville-age magmatic and metamorphosed rocks. The Lutzow Holm Belt separates the Grenville-age Maud and Rayner Provinces and is the southernmost segment of the East African Orogeny, which extended from East Africa to the Shackleton Range. Evidence for ocean closure is well-documented in the East African Orogen and this is supported by the occurrence of ophiolite material in the Shackleton Range. Further evidence for ocean closure along the Lutzow Holm Belt is provided by the different ages of Grenville-age tectonism in the Maud and Rayner Provinces of either side of the inferred suture. The climax of activity in both the Lutzow Holm and Prydz Belts was at 530 Ma, but the possibility of two-near-simultaneous collisions cannot be discounted and would mean that East Antarctica comprise three major crustal fragments that did not combine until the Cambrian.

=== Pangea: 320–160 Ma ===
Animation of the rifting of Pangaea

From 320 Ma onward, Gondwana, Laurussia, and intervening terranes merged to form the supercontinent Pangea. Pangea's main amalgamation occurred during the Carboniferous but continents continued to be added and rifted away in the Late Paleozoic to Early Mesozoic. Pangea ruptured during the Jurassic, preceded by and associated with widespread magmatic activity, including the Karoo flood basalts and related dyke swarms in South Africa and the Ferrar Province in East Antarctica.

=== Post Pangea: 160 Ma–present ===
In the Late Jurassic and Early Cretaceous, the East Antarctic Shield began to move southward at a faster rate than Africa and South America, resulting in seafloor spreading between the two sub-blocks of Gondwana in the Weddell Sea, Riiser-Larsen Sea, Mozambique and Somali basins. A long phase of extension and rifting took place in the southern Weddell Sea before the onset of seafloor spreading, dated around 147 Ma. During the mid-Cretaceous, seafloor spreading propagated eastward from the Riiser-Larsen Sea to the Enderby basin between East Antarctica and India. At 50 Ma, the inception of rapid northward drift of the Australian plate caused rapid accretion of oceanic crust on the East Antarctic Shield. Relative extension between West Australia and East Antarctica commenced in the Late Cretaceous to Early Tertiary, but oceanic crust between these two plates was formed only between 45 and 30 Ma in the Adare Trough of the Ross Sea.

== See also ==
- Geology of Antarctica – Geologic composition of Antarctica
