= M. Santosh =

Indian geoscientist

M. Santosh is an Indian geoscientist and researcher in petrology, geochemistry, geochronology, metallogeny and supercontinent tectonics. He is foreign expert and professor at the China University of Geosciences (Beijing) and emeritus professor at Kōchi University. He is also a distinguished scholar at Yonsei University.

== Early life and education ==
Santosh was born in Kerala, India. He obtained a B.Sc. in Geology from the University of Kerala in 1979, and an M.Sc. in Applied Geology from the Indian Institute of Technology Roorkee in 1981. He earned a Ph.D. in Petrology from the Cochin University of Science and Technology in 1986 and a D.Sc. in Petrology from the Osaka City University in 1990. He was awarded the degree of D.Sc. (Honoris Causa) by the University of Pretoria in 2012.

== Career ==
Santosh began his research career at the Centre for Earth Science Studies, serving as a Research Fellow from 1981 to 1983 and subsequently as a Scientist and Senior Scientist from 1983 to 2000.

From 2000 to 2012, he was Professor at Kōchi University, Japan. Since 2012, he has served as Foreign Expert and Professor at China University of Geosciences (Beijing), while continuing as Emeritus Professor at Kōchi University, Japan. He also held the position of Professorial Fellow at the University of Adelaide, Australia, from 2016 to 2024.

Santosh is the founding Editor-in-Chief of the international geoscience journal Gondwana Research and serves as Executive Advisor of Habitable Planet and Editorial Advisor of Geoscience Frontiers. He has also served as Editorial Advisor of Geosystems and Geoenvironment and as Associate Editor of Ore Geology Reviews and Geological Journal.

He is the founding Secretary-General of the International Association for Gondwana Research. He has acted as co-leader of an international research project under the framework of UNESCO on East Gondwana, and has led research projects on the geological evolution of Southern India and Gondwana supported by the Japanese Ministry of Education.

== Research and scholarly works ==
Santosh’s research focuses on petrology, mineralogy and geochemistry, isotope geology and geochronology, crust–mantle evolution, metallogeny, supercontinent assembly and breakup, environmental geology, geohazards and early life evolution. His work integrates field geology, mineral chemistry, isotope geochemistry and tectonic reconstruction to understand the long-term evolution of continents, oceans and mineral systems, as well as topics on habitability and sustainability and his research papers have gained over 0.1 million citations.

In 2013 Santosh and his team identified a 3.2-billion-year-old microcontinent, the Coorg block, within peninsular India, with findings published in Gondwana Research. The study indicates that continental formation began earlier than previously estimated (3.2–3.8 billion years ago) and documents rocks up to 3.8 billion years old.

He is also a co-author of the book Continents and Supercontinents, published by Oxford University Press, which synthesises geological, geophysical and geochemical evidence for the evolution of Earth’s supercontinents.

== See also ==
- Gondwana Research
- Columbia (supercontinent)
