= Woyla =

- District
- Interactive map of Woyla
- Coordinates: 4°23′00″N 96°06′00″E
- Country: Indonesia
- Province: Aceh
- Regency: West Aceh

Woyla is an administrative district (kecamatan) in West Aceh Regency, Aceh, Indonesia.
