= Kuunga orogeny =

Orogeny in Southeast Africa

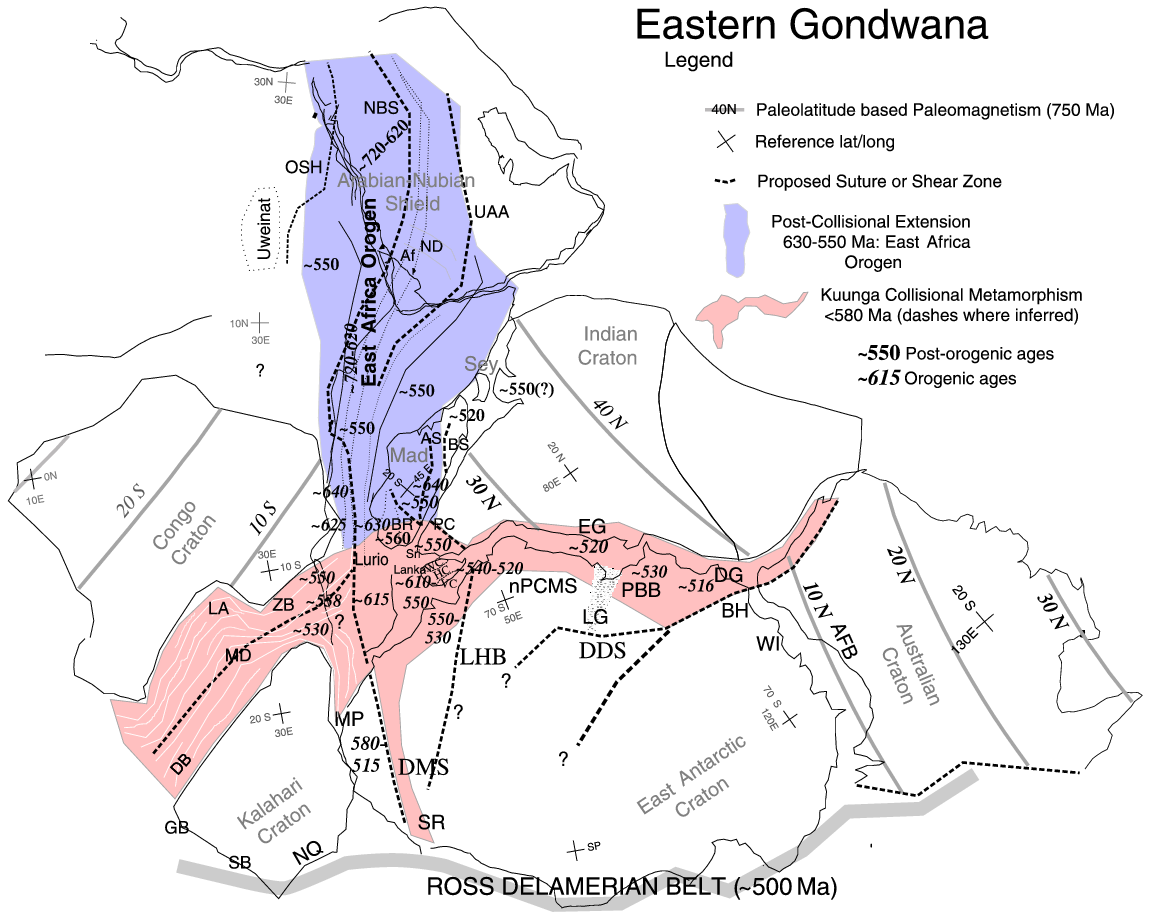
570 to 530 Ma collisional metamorphism of the Kuunga orogeny in red, 620 to 550 Ma post-collisional extension of the East African Orogeny in blue.

The Kuunga orogeny (from Swahili, "to unite") was an orogeny that occurred in South-east Africa during the Ediacaran and Cambrian. Composed of three separate orogenic belts (Damara, Zambesi, and Lurio) that are slightly younger than the East African orogeny, the Kuunga orogeny documents the collision between north and south Gondwana, or what is today Dronning Maud Land in Antarctica and northern Mozambique in Africa.

The name was proposed in 1995 by J. G. Meert, R. van der Voo and S. Ayub.

== Sources ==
- Grantham, G. H.; Macey, P. H.; Horie, K.; Kawakami, T.; Ishikawa, M.; Satish-Kumar, M.; Tsuchiya, N.; Graser, P.; Azevedo, S. (2013). "Comparison of the metamorphic history of the Monapo Complex, northern Mozambique and Balchenfjella and Austhameren areas, Sør Rondane, Antarctica: Implications for the Kuunga Orogeny and the amalgamation of N and S. Gondwana". Precambrian Research. 234: 85–135. doi:10.1016/j.precamres.2012.11.012.
- Meert, J. G. (2003). "A synopsis of events related to the assembly of eastern Gondwana". Tectonophysics. 362 (1): 1–40. Bibcode:2003Tectp.362....1M. doi:10.1016/S0040-1951(02)00629-7.
