= Gondwana Research =

- Discipline: Geology, Earth sciences
- Language: English
- Edited by: M. Santosh

Publication details
- Impact factor: 8.122 (2013)

Standard abbreviations
- ISO 4: Gondwana Res.

Indexing
- ISSN: 1342-937X

Links
- Journal homepage; Online access

Gondwana Research is a peer-reviewed scientific journal with an "all earth science" scope and an emphasis on the origin and evolution of continents. It is part of the Elsevier group, published by Journal Center, China University of Geosciences Beijing, 29 Xueyuan Road, Beijing 100083, China.
