= Geology of India =

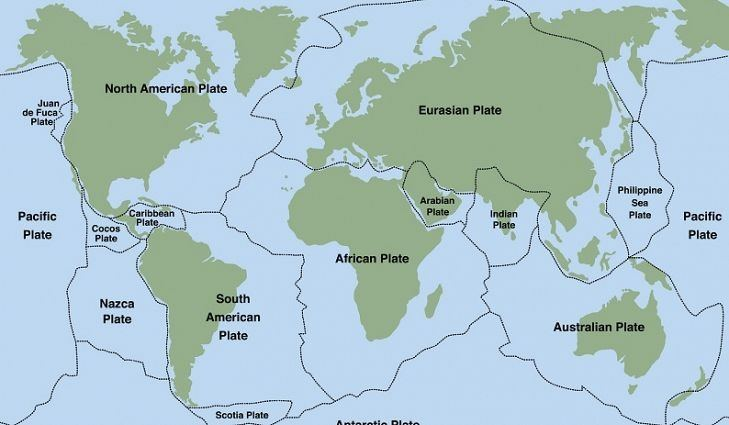
Plates in the crust of the earth, according to the plate tectonics theory

The geology of India is diverse. Different regions of the Indian subcontinent contain rocks belonging to different geologic periods, dating as far back as the Eoarchean Era. Some of the rocks are very deformed and altered. Other deposits include recently deposited alluvium that has yet to undergo diagenesis. Mineral deposits of great variety are found in the subcontinent in huge quantities. Even India's fossil record is impressive in which stromatolites, invertebrates, vertebrates and plant fossils are included. India's geographical land area can be classified into the Deccan Traps, Gondwana and Vindhyan.

The Deccan Traps covers almost all of Maharashtra, a part of Gujarat, Karnataka, Madhya Pradesh and Andhra Pradesh marginally. During its journey northward after breaking off from the rest of Gondwana, the Indian Plate passed over a geologic hotspot, the Réunion hotspot, which caused extensive melting underneath the Indian Craton. The melting broke through the surface of the craton in a massive flood basalt event, creating the Deccan Traps. It is also thought that the Reunion hotspot caused the separation of Madagascar and India.

The Gondwana and Vindhyan include within its fold parts of Madhya Pradesh, Chhattisgarh, Odisha, Bihar, Jharkhand, West Bengal, Andhra Pradesh, Maharashtra, Jammu and Kashmir, Punjab, Himachal Pradesh, Rajasthan and Uttarakhand. The Gondwana sediments form a unique sequence of fluviatile rocks deposited in Permo-Carboniferous time. The Damodar and Sone river valleys and Rajmahal hills in eastern India contain a record of the Gondwana rocks.

The Geological Survey of India has published the List of National Geological Monuments in India.

== Plate tectonics ==
The Indian Craton was once part of the supercontinent of Pangaea. At that time, what is now India's southwest coast was attached to Madagascar and southern Africa, and what is now its east coast was attached to Australia. During the Jurassic Period about 160 Ma (ICS 2004), rifting caused Pangaea to break apart into two supercontinents, namely Gondwana (to the south) and Laurasia (to the north). The Indian Craton remained attached to Gondwana, until the supercontinent began to rift apart about in the early Cretaceous, about 125 million years ago (ICS 2004). The Indian Plate then drifted northward toward the Eurasian Plate, at a pace that is the fastest known movement of any plate. It is generally believed that the Indian Plate separated from Madagascar about 90 Million years ago (ICS 2004), however some biogeographical and geological evidence suggests that the connection between Madagascar and Africa was retained at the time when the Indian Plate collided with the Eurasian Plate about 50 Million years ago (ICS 2004). This orogeny, which is continuing today, is related to closure of the Tethys Ocean. The closure of this ocean which created the Alps in Europe, and the Caucasus range in western Asia, created the Himalaya Mountains and the Tibetan Plateau in South Asia. The current orogenic event is causing parts of the Asian continent to deform westward and eastward on either side of the orogen. Concurrently with this collision, the Indian Plate sutured on to the adjacent Australian Plate, forming a new larger plate, the Indo-Australian Plate.

=== Tectonic evolution ===
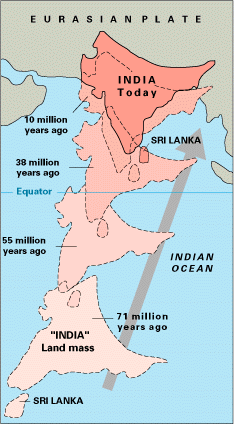
Due to continental drift, the India Plate split from Madagascar and collided with the Eurasian Plate resulting in the formation of the Himalayas.

The earliest phase of tectonic evolution was marked by the cooling and solidification of the upper crust of the earth's surface in the Archaean Era (prior to 2.5 billion years) which is represented by the exposure of gneisses and granites especially on the Peninsula. These form the core of the Indian Craton. The Aravalli Range is the remnant of an early Proterozoic orogen called the Aravali-Delhi Orogen that joined the two older segments that make up the Indian Craton. It extends approximately 500 kilometres (311 mi) from its northern end to isolated hills and rocky ridges into Haryana, ending near Delhi.

Minor igneous intrusions, deformation (folding and faulting) and subsequent metamorphism of the Aravalli Mountains represent the main phase of orogenesis. The erosion of the mountains, and further deformation of the sediments of the Dharwarian group (Bijawars) marks the second phase. The volcanic activities and intrusions, associated with this second phase are recorded in the composition of these sediments.

Early to Late Proterozoic(2.5 to 0.54 billion years) calcareous and arenaceous deposits, which correspond to humid and semi-arid climatic regimes, were deposited the Cuddapah and Vindhyan basins. These basins which border or lie within the existing crystalline basement, were uplifted during the Cambrian (500 Ma (ICS 2004)). The sediments are generally undeformed and have in many places preserved their original horizontal stratification. The Vindhyans consist of a lower Supergroup that was deposited sometime between ~1800–1600 Ma. The lower Vindhyan rocks were slightly deformed (tilted) and the Upper Vindhyan sequence lies unconformably over the Lower Vindhyan. The age of Upper Vindhyan (Kaimur, Rewa and Bhander) sedimentation is contentious. Kaimur rocks were intruded by the 1073 Ma Majhgawan kimberlite (Gregory et al., 2006) and are therefore older than 1073 Ma. The Rewa contains diamondiferous conglomerates suggesting that they formed after the Kaimur. The Rewa is conformably overlain by the Bhander Group. Indirect evidence for the age of the Upper Vindhyan was discussed by Meert and Pandit (2015) who noted the similarity in paleomagnetic directions from the 1073 Ma Majhgawan kimberlite, the 1.1 Ga Mahoba dyke and sediments of the Bhander and Rewa Groups. In addition, multiple detrital zircon studies failed to isolate any ages younger than ~1000 Ma from Upper Vindhyan rocks. A recent claim of the iconic Ediacaran fossil "Dickinsonia" located in the Upper Bhander (Retallack et al., 2021) required an Ediacaran age for that Group; however, Meert et al. (2023) demonstrated that the fossil was misidentified and therefore the age of the Upper Vindhyan is still debated.

Early Paleozoic rocks are found in the Himalayas and consist of southerly derived sediments eroded from the crystalline craton and deposited on the Indian platform.

In the Late Paleozoic, Permo-Carboniferous glaciations left extensive glacio-fluvial deposits across central India, in new basins created by sag/normal faulting. These tillites and glacially derived sediments are designated the Gondwanas series. The sediments are overlain by rocks resulting from a Permian marine transgression (270 Ma (ICS 2004)).

The late Paleozoic coincided with the deformation and drift of the Gondwana supercontinent. To this drift, the uplift of the Vindhyan sediments and the deposition of northern peripheral sediments in the Himalayan Sea, can be attributed.

During the Jurassic, as Pangea began to rift apart, large grabens formed in central India filling with Upper Jurassic and Lower Cretaceous sandstones and conglomerates.

By the Late Cretaceous India had separated from Australia and Africa and was moving northward towards Asia. At this time, prior to the Deccan eruptions, uplift in southern India resulted in sedimentation in the adjacent nascent Indian Ocean. Exposures of these rocks occur along the south Indian coast at Pondicherry and in Tamil Nadu.

At the close of the Mesozoic one of the greatest volcanic eruptions in earth's history occurred, the Deccan lava flows. Covering more than 500,000 square kilometres (193,051 sq mi) area, these mark the final break from Gondwana.

In the early Tertiary, the first phase of the Himalayan orogeny, the Karakoram phase occurred. The Himalayan orogeny has continued to the present day.

=== Greater India ===
Greater India or the Greater India Basin means the Indian Plate plus a postulated northern extension which either subducted under Eurasia or pressed against (or drag) Eurasia's ancient volcanic mountains farther north. As a result, the crust of this formerly coastal region shortened under compression and thickened to become what is today the Tibetan Plateau. The term was used before plate tectonic theory, but the term has seen increased usage since the 1970s.

The Indian Plate and the Eurasian Plate have converged up to 3,600 km (2,200 mi) ± 35 km (22 mi). The upper crustal shortening is documented from the geological record of Asia and the Himalaya as up to approximately 2,350 km (1,460 mi) less. Much of the lost area was pushed under Asia to form the Tibetan highland.

== Major rock groups ==
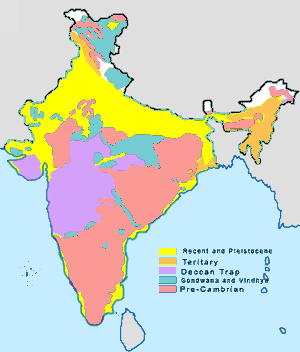
Map of chronostratigraphic divisions of India

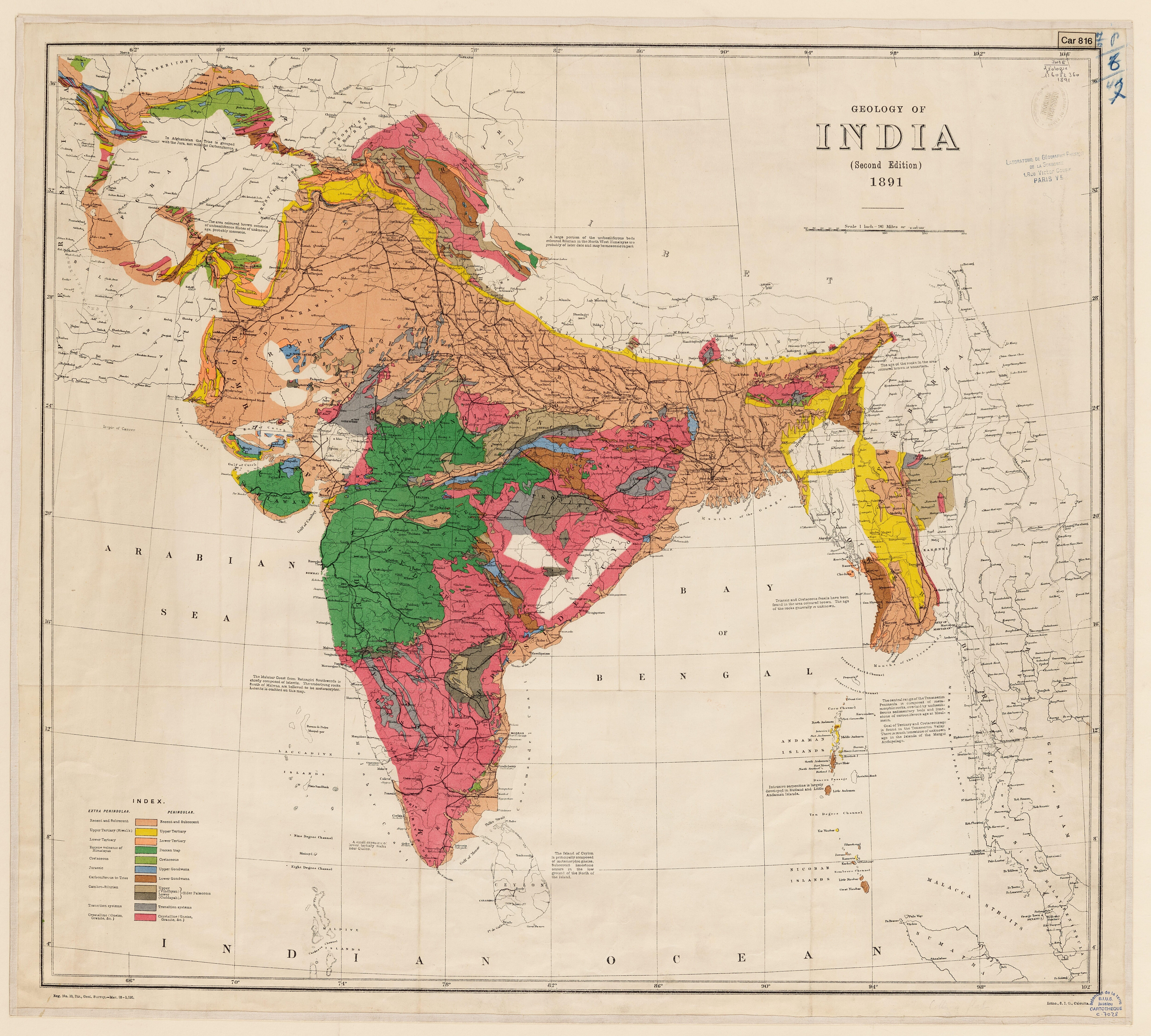
1891 Geological map of India

=== Precambrian super-eon ===
A considerable area of peninsular India, the Indian Shield, consists of Archean gneisses and schists which are the oldest rocks found in India. The Precambrian rocks of India have been classified into two systems, namely the Dharwar system and the Archaean system (gneiss and schists).

The Dharwar System

The rocks of the Dharwar system are mainly sedimentary in origin, and occur in narrow elongated synclines resting on the gneisses found in Bellary district, Mysore and the Aravalis of Rajputana. These rocks are enriched in manganese and iron ore which represents a significant resource of these metals. They are also extensively mineralised with gold most notably the Kolar gold mines located in Kolar. In the north and west of India, the Vaikrita system, which occurs in Hundar, Kumaon and Spiti areas, the Dailing series in Sikkim and the Shillong series in Assam are believed to be of the same age as the Dharwar system.

The metamorphic basement consists of gneisses which are further classified into the Bengal gneiss, the Bundelkhand gneiss and the Nilgiri gneiss. The Nilgiri system comprises charnockites ranging from granites to gabbros.

=== Phanerozoic ===
==== Palaeozoic ====
===== Lower Paleozoic =====
Rocks of the earliest part of the Cambrian Period are found in the Salt range in Punjab and the Spiti area in the central Himalayas and consist of a thick sequence of fossiliferous sediments. In the Salt range, the stratigraphy starts with the Salt Pseudomorph zone, which has a thickness of 450 feet (137 m) and consists of dolomites and sandstones. It is overlain by magnesian sandstones with a thickness of 250 feet (76 m), similar to the underlying dolomites. These sandstones have very few fossils. Overlying the sandstones is the Neobolus Shale, which is composed of dark shales with a thickness of 100 feet (30 m). Finally there is a zone consisting of red or purple sandstones having a thickness of 250 feet (76 m) to 400 feet (122 m) called the Purple Sandstone. These are unfossiliferous and show sun-cracks and worm burrows which are typical of subaerial weathering. The deposits in Spiti are known as the Haimanta system and they consist of slates, micaceous quartzite and dolomitic limestones. The Ordovician rocks comprise flaggy shales, limestones, red quartzites, quartzites, sandstones and conglomerates. Siliceous limestones belonging to the Silurian overlie the Ordovician rocks. These limestones are in turn overlain by white quartzite and this is known as Muth quartzite. Silurian rocks which contain typical Silurian fauna are also found in the Vihi district of Kashmir.

===== Upper Paleozoic =====
Devonian fossils and corals are found in grey limestone in the central Himalayas and in black limestone in the Chitral area. The Carboniferous is composed of two distinct sequences, the upper Carboniferous Po, and the lower Carboniferous Lipak. Fossils of brachiopods and some trilobites are found in the calcareous and sandy rocks of the Lipak series. The Syringothyris limestone in Kashmir also belongs to the Lipak. The Po series overlies the Lipak series, and the Fenestella shales are interbedded within a sequence of quartzites and dark shales. In many places Carboniferous strata are overlaid by grey agglomeratic slates, believed to be of volcanic origin. Many genera of productids are found in the limestones of the Permo-Triassic, which has led to these rocks being referred to as "productus limestone". This limestone is of marine origin and is divided into three distinct lithostratigraphic units based on the productus chronology: the Late Permian Chideru, which contains many ammonites, the Late — Middle Permian Virgal, and the Middle Permian Amb unit.

==== Mesozoic ====
In the Triassic the Ceratite beds, named after the ammonite ceratite, consist of arenaceous limestones, calcerous sandstones and marls. The Jurassic consists of two distinct units. The Kioto limestone, extends from the lower the middle Jurassic with a thickness 2,000 feet (610 m) to 3,000 feet (914 m). The upper Jurassic is represented by the Spiti black shales, and stretches from the Karakoram to Sikkim. Cretaceous rocks cover an extensive area in India. In South India, the sedimentary rocks are divided into four stages; the Niniyur, the Ariyalur, the Trichinopoly(a district in the Madras Presidency, covering present-day districts of Tiruchirappalli, Karur, Ariyalur and Perambalur), and the Utatur stages. In the Utatur stage the rocks host phosphate nodules, which constitute an important source of phosphates in the country. In the central provinces, the well developed beds of Lameta contain fossil records which are helpful in estimating the age of the Deccan Traps. This sequence of basaltic rocks was formed near the end of the Cretaceous period due to volcanic activity. These lava flows occupy an area of 200,000 square miles (520,000 km^{2}). These rocks are a source of high quality building stone and also provide a very fertile clayey loam, particularly suited to cotton cultivation.

==== Cenozoic ====
===== Tertiary period =====
In this period the Himalayan orogeny began, and the volcanism associated with the Deccan Traps continued. The rocks of this era have valuable deposits of petroleum and coal. Sandstones of Eocene age are found in Punjab, which grade into chalky limestones with oil seepages. Further north the rocks found in the Simla area are divided into three series, the Sabathu series consisting of grey and red shales, the Dagshai series of bright red clays and the Kasauli series sandstones. Towards the east in Assam, Nummulitic limestone is found in the Khasi hills. Oil is associated with these rocks of the Oligo-Miocene age. Along the foothills of the Himalayas the Siwalik molasse is composed of sandstones, conglomerates and shales with thicknesses of 16,000 feet (4,877 m) to 20,000 feet (6,096 m) and ranging from Eocene to Pliocene. These rocks are notable for their rich vertebrate fauna including many fossil hominoids.

===== Quaternary period =====
The alluvium which is found in the Indo-Gangetic Plain belongs to this era. It was eroded from the Himalayas by the rivers and the monsoons. These alluvial deposits consist of clay, loam, silt etc. and are divided into the older alluvium and the newer alluvium. The older alluvium is called Bhangar and is present in the ground above the flood level of the rivers. Khaddar or newer alluvium is confined to the river channels and their flood plains. This region has some of the most fertile soil found in the country as new silt is continually laid down by the rivers every year.

== Geological formations ==
=== Geothermal fields ===
The geothermal resource map for India has been grouped into six geothermal provinces:

- Himalayan Province – Tertiary orogenic belt with tertiary magmatism
- Faulted blocks province – the Aravalli Range, Naga–Lushi, the west coast regions, and the NarmadaSon lineament.
- Volcanic arc province – the Andaman and Nicobar arc.
- Deep sedimentary basins of Tertiary age such as the Cambay basin.
- Radioactive province – Surajkund, Hazaribagh and Jharkhand.
- Dharwar Cratonic province – Peninsular India

India has about 340 hot springs spread over the country. Of these, 62 are distributed along the northwest Himalaya, in the states of Jammu and Kashmir, Himachal Pradesh and Uttarakhand. They are found concentrated in a 30–50-km wide thermal band mostly along the river valleys. The Naga–Lusai and West Coast Provinces also manifest a series of thermal springs. The Andaman and Nicobar arc is the only place in India where volcanic activity continues, potentially a good site for geothermal energy. The Cambay geothermal belt is 200 km long and 50 km wide, with Tertiary sediments. Thermal springs have been reported from the belt although they are not of very high temperature or flow levels. High subsurface temperature and thermal fluid have been reported in deep drill wells in depth ranges of 1.7 to 1.9 km during drilling in this area. The thermal springs in India's peninsular region are more related to the faults, which allow water to circulate to considerable depths. The circulating water acquires heat from the normal thermal gradient in the area, and can emerge at a high temperature.

== Earthquakes ==
The Indian subcontinent has a history of devastating earthquakes. The Assam earthquake of 1950 registered a magnitude of 8.6; it is one of the most powerful earthquakes to have ever been recorded. A similar earthquake in a densely populated area today would kill hundreds of thousands if not millions. This is why the Himalayan range is believed to be one of the most dangerous places to build large dams. The major reason for the high frequency and intensity of the earthquakes is that the Indian plate is driving into Asia at a rate of approximately 47 mm/year. Geographical statistics of India show that almost 54% of the land is vulnerable to earthquakes. A World Bank & United Nations report shows estimates that around 200 million city dwellers in India will be exposed to storms and earthquakes by 2050. National Disaster Management Authority says that 60% of Indian landmass is prone to earthquake and 8% susceptible to cyclone risks.

== See also ==
- Geology of Aravalli Range
- National Geological Monuments of India
