= List of paleocontinents =

Animation of the break-up of the supercontinent Pangaea and the subsequent drift of its constituents, from the Early Triassic to recent (250 Ma to 0).

This is a list of paleocontinents, significant landmasses that have been proposed to exist in the geological past. The degree of certainty to which the identified landmasses can be regarded as independent entities reduces as geologists look further back in time. The list includes cratons, supercratons, microcontinents, continents and supercontinents. For the Archean to Paleoproterozoic cores of most of the continents see also list of shields and cratons. Dates in the table are given in Ma (Megaannum), equivalent to mya (million years ago).

== List of paleocontinents ==
Name	Age (Ma)	Period/Era Range	Type	Comments	Sources
Amazonia	1300		Craton		
Arabia–Nubia	610	Neoproterozoic	Microcontinent	Rifted off Rodinia at about 840 Ma. Then accreted to North Africa with large volume of juvenile crust during the Pan-African orogeny to form the Arabian-Nubian Shield.	
Arctica	2565	Neoarchean	Supercraton		
Argoland	155		an archipelago of microcontinents	Rifted off Australia 155 Ma ago after splitting into microcontinents about 215Ma ago	
Atlantica	1500	Mesoproterozoic	Continent	Formed from a series of cratons during the development of Columbia - independent from about 1500 Ma, following break-up of Columbia - part of Rodinia from 1000 Ma	
Avalonia	800	Cambrian	Continent	Rifted off northern Gondwana in the Cambrian, eventually colliding with Laurentia and Baltica in the Caledonian Orogeny to form Laurussia.	
Baltica	2000	Paleoproterozoic	Continent	Formed from three cratonic fragments - the Baltic Shield, Sarmatia and Volgo–Uralia. Formed part of Columbia, then Rodinia and Pannotia. Collided with Laurentia and Avalonia to form Laurussia.	
Cathaysia	1800	Late Paleozoic	Continent	Fused with the Yangtze block to form the South China Craton during the Early Paleozoic.	
Cimmeria	300	Late Carboniferous–Early Permian	Continent	Rifted off margin of Gondwana, opening up Neotethys, collided with Laurasia about 150 Ma in the Cimmerian Orogeny. Regarded as being made up of many separate continental fragments.	
Columbia (Nuna)	2100	Paleoproterozoic	Supercontinent	Oldest widely accepted supercontinent. also known as Nuna.	
East Antarctica			Craton		
East European			Craton	The cratonic core of Baltica or a synonym for the paleocontinent	
Gondwana	500	Late Neoproterozoic	Continent	Also described as a supercontinent	
India			Continent		
Kalahari			Craton		
Kazakhstania			Continent		
Kenorland	2720	Neoarchean	Supercontinent	Alternatively, landmasses may have grouped into two supercratons, Sclavia and Superia	
Laurasia		Carboniferous- Jurassic	Supercontinent	Formed by the break-up of Pangaea after Kazakhstania and Siberia had joined with the former Laurussia	
Laurentia	1830	Paleoproterozoic	Craton		
Laurussia	425	Early Devonian	Continent	The "Old Red Continent" formed by the Caledonian Orogeny, joined with Gondwana to form Pangaea	
Mawson	1730	Paleoproterozoic	Continent		
Nena	1900	Paleoproterozoic	Continent		
North Australia	2000	Paleoproterozoic	Craton		
North China	2500	Paleoproterozoic	Craton		
Pangaea	350	Early Permian - Early Jurassic	Supercontinent		
Pannotia	600	Neoproterozoic	Supercontinent		
Rodinia	1000	Mesoproterozoic	Supercontinent		
São Francisco–Congo	1800	Proterozoic	Craton		
Sahul		Paleoproterozoic	Continent	mainland Australia, Tasmania, New Guinea, and Aru Islands.	
Sclavia		Paleoarchean	Supercraton		
Siberia	2800	Neoarchean	Continent		
South Australia			Craton		
South China		Neoproterozoic	Craton		
Superia	2680	Neoarchean	Supercraton		
Tarim		Early Mesoproterozoic	Craton		
Ur	3100	Mesoarchean	Continent		
Vaalbara	3300	Late Neoarchean–Early Paleoproterozoic	Continent		
West Africa		Paleoproterozoic	Craton		
West Australia	2000	Paleoproterozoic	Craton		
Yangtze	1800	Late Neoarchean–Early Paleoproterozoic	Craton	Fused with the Cathaysia block to form the South China Craton during the Early Paleozoic.	
