= Sahul =

Prehistoric continent comprising Australia and New Guinea

Map of Sahul with Sunda

Sahul (/sə.ˈhuːl/, sə-HOOL), also called Sahul-land, Meganesia, Papualand and Greater Australia, was a paleocontinent that encompassed the modern-day landmasses of mainland Australia, Tasmania, New Guinea, and the Aru Islands.

Sahul was in the south-western Pacific Ocean, located approximately north to south between the Equator and the 44th parallel south and west to east between the 112th and the 152nd meridians east. Sahul was separated from Sunda to its west by the Wallacean Archipelago. At its largest, when ocean levels were at their lowest, it was approximately 10,600,000 square kilometres (4,100,000 sq mi) in size. (Note: The present-day area of Australia, New Guinea and Tasmania is approximately 8,500,000 square kilometres (3,300,000 sq mi).)

Parts of Sahul repeatedly emerged and submerged throughout the Pleistocene epoch, beginning around 2.6 million years ago. Glacial cycles—initially paced at ~41,000 years and later at ~100,000 years—drove sea-level fluctuations of up to ~120 m. Each lowstand exposed the Sahul continental shelf, with reconstructions showing land connections dating back at least ~250,000 years ago, and likely much earlier. The most recent rise in sea level, at the close of the last Ice Age, produced the modern configuration: New Guinea separated from mainland Australia about 8,000 years ago, and Tasmania about 6,000 years ago.

Sahul hosted a large variety of unique fauna that changed independently from the rest of the world. Most notably nearly all mammals on Sahul were marsupials including a range of browsers, burrowers, scavengers and predators; bats and rodents represented the only placental mammals.

It is estimated humans first migrated to Sahul at least 65,000 years ago, making the ocean crossing from Sunda through Wallacea. Archaeologist Glenn Summerhayes led excavations in the Ivane Valley in the Papua New Guinea highlands finding that the sites were occupied from 49,000 to 44,000 years ago. From Sahul humans spread throughout Oceania.

== Usage ==
The name Sahul is used by archaeologists, and Meganesia tends to be used by zoogeographers. The name Greater Australia has been used, and has been criticised as "cartographic imperialism" because it places greater emphasis upon what is now Australia at the expense of New Guinea.

== See also ==
- Arafura Sea – Marginal sea between Australia and Indonesian New Guinea
- List of paleocontinents
- Wallace Line
