= Supercontinent =

Landmass comprising more than one continental core, or craton

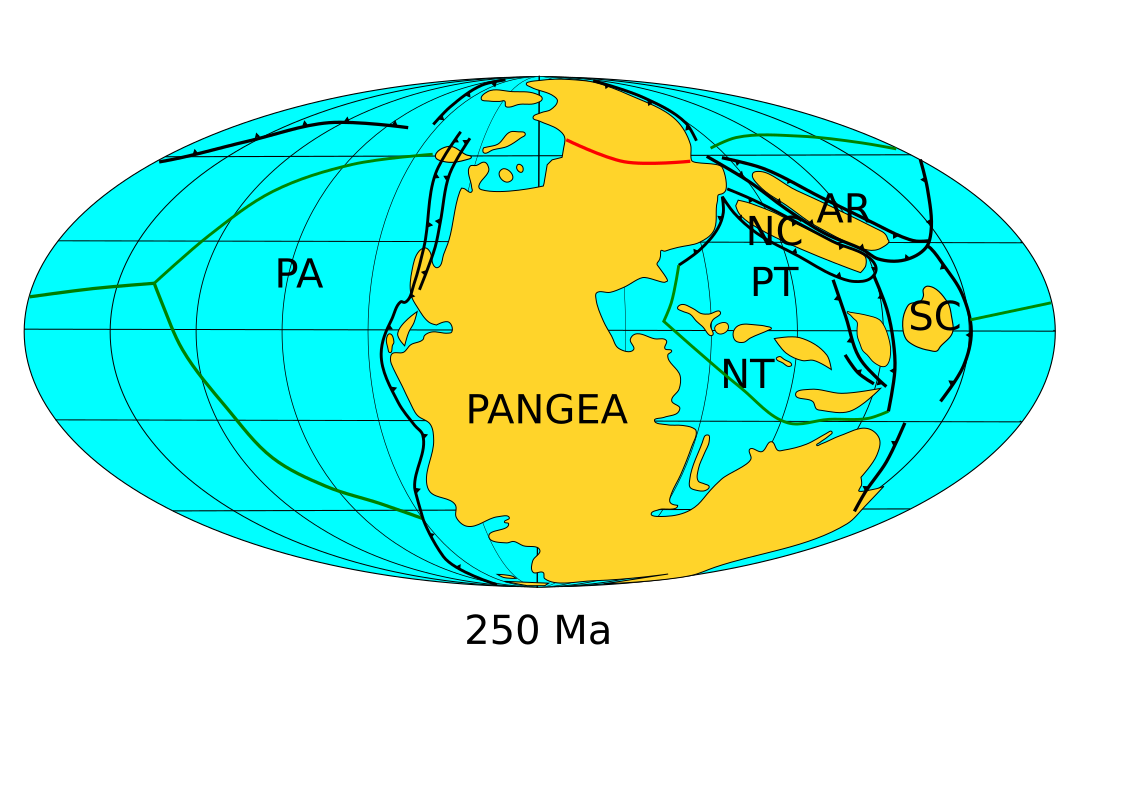
A paleomap showing the supercontinent of Pangaea with the positions of the continents at the Permian-Triassic boundary, about 250 Ma. AR=Amuria; NC=North China; SC=South China; PA=Panthalassic Ocean; PT=Paleotethys Ocean; NT=Neotethys Ocean. Orogens shown in red. Subduction zones shown in black. Spreading centers shown in green.

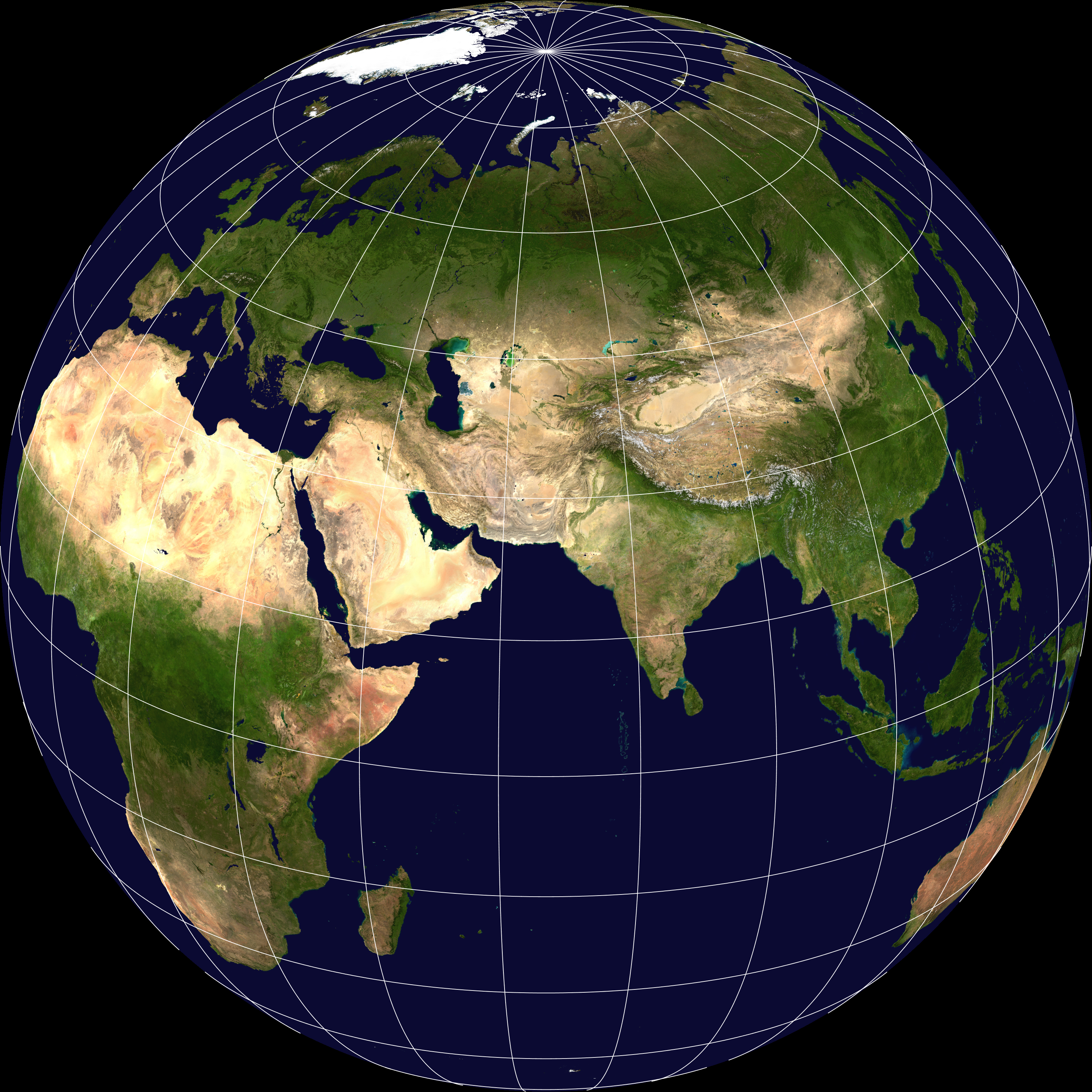
Although not a supercontinent, the current Afro-Eurasian landmass contains about 57% of Earth's land area.

In geology, a supercontinent is the assembly of most or all of Earth's continental blocks or cratons to form a single large landmass. However, some geologists use a different definition, "a grouping of formerly dispersed continents", which leaves room for interpretation and is easier to apply to Precambrian times. To separate supercontinents from other groupings, a limit has been proposed in which a continent must include at least about 75% of the continental crust then in existence in order to qualify as a supercontinent.

Moving under the forces of plate tectonics, supercontinents have assembled and dispersed multiple times in the geologic past. According to modern definitions, a supercontinent does not exist today; the closest is the current Afro-Eurasian landmass, which covers approximately 57% of Earth's total land area. The last period in which the continental landmasses were near to one another was 336 to 175 million years ago, forming the supercontinent Pangaea. The positions of continents have been accurately determined back to the early Jurassic, shortly before the breakup of Pangaea. Pangaea's predecessor Gondwana is not considered a supercontinent under the first definition since the landmasses of Baltica, Laurentia and Siberia were separate at the time.

A future supercontinent, termed Pangaea Proxima, is hypothesized to form within the next 250 million years.

== Theories ==
The Phanerozoic supercontinent Pangaea began to break up 215 Ma and this distancing continues today. Because Pangaea is the most recent of Earth's supercontinents, it is the best known and understood. Contributing to Pangaea's popularity in the classroom, its reconstruction is almost as simple as fitting together the present continents bordering the Atlantic Ocean like puzzle pieces.

For the period before Pangaea, there are two contrasting models for supercontinent evolution through geological time.

=== Series ===
The first model theorizes that at least two separate supercontinents existed comprising Vaalbara and Kenorland, with Kenorland comprising Superia and Sclavia. These parts of Neoarchean age broke off at ~2480 and 2312 Ma, and portions of them later collided to form Nuna (Northern Europe and North America). Nuna continued to develop during the Mesoproterozoic, primarily by lateral accretion of juvenile arcs, and in ~1000 Ma Nuna collided with other land masses, forming Rodinia. Between ~825 and 750 Ma Rodinia broke apart. However, before completely breaking up, some fragments of Rodinia had already come together to form Gondwana by ~608 Ma. Pangaea formed through the collision of Gondwana, Laurasia (Laurentia and Baltica), and Siberia.

=== Protopangea–Paleopangea ===
The second model (Kenorland-Arctica) is based on both palaeomagnetic and geological evidence and proposes that the continental crust comprised a single supercontinent from ~2.72 Ga until break-up during the Ediacaran period after ~0.573 Ga. The reconstruction is derived from the observation that palaeomagnetic poles converge to quasi-static positions for long intervals between ~2.72–2.115 Ga; 1.35–1.13 Ga; and 0.75–0.573 Ga with only small peripheral modifications to the reconstruction. During the intervening periods, the poles conform to a unified apparent polar wander path.

Although it contrasts the first model, the first phase (Protopangea) essentially incorporates Vaalbara and Kenorland of the first model. The explanation for the prolonged duration of the Protopangea–Paleopangea supercontinent appears to be that lid tectonics (comparable to the tectonics operating on Mars and Venus) prevailed during Precambrian times. According to this theory, plate tectonics as seen on the contemporary Earth became dominant only during the latter part of geological times. This approach was widely criticized by many researchers as it uses incorrect application of paleomagnetic data.

== Cycles ==
A supercontinent cycle is the break-up of one supercontinent and the development of another, which takes place on a global scale. Supercontinent cycles are not the same as the Wilson cycle, which is the opening and closing of an individual oceanic basin. The Wilson cycle rarely synchronizes with the timing of a supercontinent cycle. However, supercontinent cycles and Wilson cycles were both involved in the creation of Pangaea and Rodinia.

Secular trends such as carbonatites, granulites, eclogites, and greenstone belt deformation events are all possible indicators of Precambrian supercontinent cyclicity, although the Protopangea–Paleopangea solution implies that Phanerozoic style of supercontinent cycles did not operate during these times. Also, there are instances where these secular trends have a weak, uneven, or absent imprint on the supercontinent cycle; secular methods for supercontinent reconstruction will produce results that have only one explanation, and each explanation for a trend must fit in with the rest.

The following table names reconstructed ancient supercontinents, using Bradley's 2011 looser definition, with an approximate timescale of millions of years ago (Ma).

Supercontinent name	Age (Ma)	Period/Era Range	Comment
Vaalbara	3,636–2,803	Eoarchean-Mesoarchean	Also described as a supercraton or just a continent
Ur	2,803–2,408	Mesoarchean-Siderian	Described as both a continent and a supercontinent
Kenorland	2,720–2,114	Neoarchean-Rhyacian	Alternatively the continents may have formed into two groupings Superia and Sclavia
Arctica	2,114–1,995	Rhyacian-Orosirian	Not generally regarded as a supercontinent, depending on definition
Atlantica	1,991–1,124	Orosirian-Stenian	Not generally regarded as a supercontinent, depending on definition
Columbia (Nuna)	1,820–1,350	Orosirian-Ectasian	
Rodinia	1,130–750	Stenian-Tonian	
Pannotia	633–573	Ediacaran	
Gondwana	550–175	Ediacaran-Jurassic	From the Carboniferous, formed part of Pangaea, not always regarded as a supercontinent
Pangaea	336–175	Carboniferous-Jurassic	

== Volcanism ==
The causes of supercontinent assembly and dispersal are thought to be driven by convection processes in Earth's mantle. Approximately 660 km into the mantle, a discontinuity occurs, affecting the surface crust through processes involving plumes and superplumes (a.k.a. large low-shear-velocity provinces). When a slab of the subducted crust is denser than the surrounding mantle, it sinks to discontinuity. Once the slabs build up, they will sink through to the lower mantle in what is known as a "slab avalanche". This displacement at the discontinuity will cause the lower mantle to compensate and rise elsewhere. The rising mantle can form a plume or superplume.

Besides having compositional effects on the upper mantle by replenishing the large-ion lithophile elements, volcanism affects plate movement. The plates will be moved towards a geoidal low perhaps where the slab avalanche occurred and pushed away from the geoidal high that can be caused by the plumes or superplumes. This causes the continents to push together to form supercontinents and was evidently the process that operated to cause the early continental crust to aggregate into Protopangea.

Dispersal of supercontinents is caused by the accumulation of heat underneath the crust due to the rising of very large convection cells or plumes, and a massive heat release resulted in the final break-up of Paleopangea. Accretion occurs over geoidal lows that can be caused by avalanche slabs or the downgoing limbs of convection cells. Evidence of the accretion and dispersion of supercontinents is seen in the geological rock record.

The influence of known volcanic eruptions does not compare to that of flood basalts. The timing of flood basalts has corresponded with a large-scale continental break-up. However, due to a lack of data on the time required to produce flood basalts, the climatic impact is difficult to quantify. The timing of a single lava flow is also undetermined. These are important factors on how flood basalts influenced paleoclimate.

== Plate tectonics ==
Global palaeogeography and plate interactions as far back as Pangaea are relatively well understood today. However, the evidence becomes more sparse further back in geologic history. Marine magnetic anomalies, passive margin match-ups, geologic interpretation of orogenic belts, paleomagnetism, paleobiogeography of fossils, and distribution of climatically sensitive strata are all methods to obtain evidence for continent locality and indicators of the environment throughout time.

Phanerozoic (541 Ma to present) and Precambrian (4.6 Ga to 541 Ma) had primarily passive margins and detrital zircons (and orogenic granites), whereas the tenure of Pangaea contained few. Matching edges of continents are where passive margins form. The edges of these continents may rift. At this point, seafloor spreading becomes the driving force. Passive margins are therefore born during the break-up of supercontinents and die during supercontinent assembly. Pangaea's supercontinent cycle is a good example of the efficiency of using the presence or lack of these entities to record the development, tenure, and break-up of supercontinents. There is a sharp decrease in passive margins between 500 and 350 Ma during the timing of Pangaea's assembly. The tenure of Pangaea is marked by a low number of passive margins during 336 to 275 Ma, and its break-up is indicated accurately by an increase in passive margins.

Orogenic belts can form during the assembly of continents and supercontinents. The orogenic belts present on continental blocks are classified into three different categories and have implications for interpreting geologic bodies. Intercratonic orogenic belts are characteristic of ocean basin closure. Clear indicators of intracratonic activity contain ophiolites and other oceanic materials that are present in the suture zone. Intracratonic orogenic belts occur as thrust belts and do not contain any oceanic material. However, the absence of ophiolites is not strong evidence for intracratonic belts, because the oceanic material can be squeezed out and eroded away in an intracratonic environment. The third kind of orogenic belt is a confined orogenic belt which is the closure of small basins. The assembly of a supercontinent would have to show intracratonic orogenic belts. However, interpretation of orogenic belts can be difficult.

The collision of Gondwana and Laurasia occurred in the late Palaeozoic. By this collision, the Variscan mountain range was created, along the equator. This 6000-km-long mountain range is usually referred to in two parts: the Hercynian mountain range of the late Carboniferous makes up the eastern part, and the western part is the Appalachian Mountains, uplifted in the early Permian. (The existence of a flat elevated plateau like the Tibetan Plateau is under debate.) The locality of the Variscan range made it influential to both the northern and southern hemispheres. The elevation of the Appalachians would greatly influence global atmospheric circulation.

== Climate ==
Continents affect the climate of the planet drastically, with supercontinents having a larger, more prevalent influence. Continents modify global wind patterns, control ocean current paths, and have a higher albedo than the oceans. Winds are redirected by mountains, and albedo differences cause shifts in onshore winds. Higher elevation in continental interiors produces a cooler, drier climate, the phenomenon of continentality. This is seen today in Eurasia, and rock record shows evidence of continentality in the middle of Pangaea.

=== Glacial ===
The term glacial-epoch refers to a long episode of glaciation on Earth over millions of years. Glaciers have major implications on the climate, particularly through sea level change. Changes in the position and elevation of the continents, the paleolatitude and ocean circulation affect the glacial epochs. There is an association between the rifting and breakup of continents and supercontinents and glacial epochs. According to the model for Precambrian supercontinent series, the breakup of Kenorland and Rodinia was associated with the Paleoproterozoic and Neoproterozoic glacial epochs, respectively.

In contrast, the Protopangea–Paleopangea theory shows that these glaciations correlated with periods of low continental velocity, and it is concluded that a fall in tectonic and corresponding volcanic activity was responsible for these intervals of global frigidity. During the accumulation of supercontinents with times of regional uplift, glacial epochs seem to be rare with little supporting evidence. However, the lack of evidence does not allow for the conclusion that glacial epochs are not associated with the collisional assembly of supercontinents. This could just represent a preservation bias.

During the late Ordovician (~458.4 Ma), the particular configuration of Gondwana may have allowed for glaciation and high CO_{2} levels to occur at the same time. However, some geologists disagree and think that there was a temperature increase at this time. This increase may have been strongly influenced by the movement of Gondwana across the South Pole, which may have prevented lengthy snow accumulation. Although late Ordovician temperatures at the South Pole may have reached freezing, there were no ice sheets during the early Silurian (~443.8 Ma) through the late Mississippian (~330.9 Ma). Agreement can be met with the theory that continental snow can occur when the edge of a continent is near the pole. Therefore Gondwana, although located tangent to the South Pole, may have experienced glaciation along its coasts.

=== Precipitation ===
Though precipitation rates during monsoonal circulations are difficult to predict, there is evidence for a large orographic barrier within the interior of Pangaea during the late Paleozoic (~251.9 Ma). The possibility of the southwest–northeast trending Appalachian-Hercynian Mountains makes the region's monsoonal circulations potentially relatable to present-day monsoonal circulations surrounding the Tibetan Plateau, which is known to positively influence the magnitude of monsoonal periods within Eurasia. It is therefore somewhat expected that lower topography in other regions of the supercontinent during the Jurassic would negatively influence precipitation variations. The breakup of supercontinents may have affected local precipitation. When any supercontinent breaks up, there will be an increase in precipitation runoff over the surface of the continental landmasses, increasing silicate weathering and the consumption of CO_{2}.

=== Temperature ===
Even though during the Archaean solar radiation was reduced by 30 percent and the Cambrian-Precambrian boundary by 6 percent, the Earth has only experienced three ice ages throughout the Precambrian. Erroneous conclusions are more likely to be made when models are limited to one climatic configuration (which is usually present-day).

Cold winters in continental interiors are due to rate ratios of radiative cooling (greater) and heat transport from continental rims. To raise winter temperatures within continental interiors, the rate of heat transport must increase to become greater than the rate of radiative cooling. Through climate models, alterations in atmospheric CO_{2} content and ocean heat transport are not comparatively effective.

CO_{2} models suggest that values were low in the late Cenozoic and Carboniferous-Permian glaciations. Although early Paleozoic values are much larger (more than 10 percent higher than that of today). This may be due to high seafloor spreading rates after the breakup of Precambrian supercontinents and the lack of land plants as a carbon sink.

During the late Permian, it is expected that seasonal Pangaean temperatures varied drastically. Subtropic summer temperatures were warmer than that of today by as much as 6–10 degrees, and mid-latitudes in the winter were less than −30 degrees Celsius. These seasonal changes within the supercontinent were influenced by the large size of Pangaea. And, just like today, coastal regions experienced much less variation.

During the Jurassic, summer temperatures did not rise above zero degrees Celsius along the northern rim of Laurasia, which was the northernmost part of Pangaea (the southernmost portion of Pangaea was Gondwana). Ice-rafted dropstones sourced from Russia are indicators of this northern boundary. The Jurassic is thought to have been approximately 10 degrees Celsius warmer along 90 degrees East paleolongitude compared to the present temperature of today's central Eurasia.

=== Milankovitch cycles ===
Many studies of the Milankovitch cycles during supercontinent time periods have focused on the mid-Cretaceous. Present amplitudes of Milankovitch cycles over present-day Eurasia may be mirrored in both the southern and northern hemispheres of the supercontinent Pangaea. Climate modeling shows that summer fluctuations varied 14–16 degrees Celsius on Pangaea, which is similar or slightly higher than summer temperatures of Eurasia during the Pleistocene. The largest-amplitude Milankovitch cycles are expected to have been at mid-to high-latitudes during the Triassic and Jurassic.

=== Atmospheric gases ===
Plate tectonics and the chemical composition of the atmosphere (specifically greenhouse gases) are the two most prevailing factors present within the geologic time scale. Continental drift influences both cold and warm climatic episodes. Atmospheric circulation and climate are strongly influenced by the location and formation of continents and supercontinents. Therefore, continental drift influences mean global temperature.

Oxygen levels of the Archaean were negligible, and today they are roughly 21 percent. It is thought that the Earth's oxygen content has risen in stages: six or seven steps that are timed very closely to the development of Earth's supercontinents.

1. Continents collide
2. Super-mountains form
3. Erosion of super-mountains
4. Large quantities of minerals and nutrients wash out to open ocean
5. Explosion of marine algae life (partly sourced from noted nutrients)
6. Mass amounts of oxygen produced during photosynthesis

The process of Earth's increase in atmospheric oxygen content is theorized to have started with the continent-continent collision of huge landmasses forming supercontinents, and therefore possibly supercontinent mountain ranges (super-mountains). These super-mountains would have eroded, and the mass amounts of nutrients, including iron and phosphorus, would have washed into oceans, just as is seen happening today. The oceans would then be rich in nutrients essential to photosynthetic organisms, which would then be able to respire mass amounts of oxygen. There is an apparent direct relationship between orogeny and the atmospheric oxygen content. There is also evidence for increased sedimentation concurrent with the timing of these mass oxygenation events, meaning that the organic carbon and pyrite at these times were more likely to be buried beneath sediment and therefore unable to react with the free oxygen. This sustained the atmospheric oxygen increases.

At 2.65 Ga there was an increase in molybdenum isotope fractionation. It was temporary but supports the increase in atmospheric oxygen because molybdenum isotopes require free oxygen to fractionate. Between 2.45 and 2.32 Ga, the second period of oxygenation occurred, which has been called the 'great oxygenation event.' Evidence supporting this event includes red beds appearance 2.3 Ga (meaning that Fe^{3+} was being produced and became an important component in soils).

The third oxygenation stage approximately 1.8 Ga is indicated by the disappearance of iron formations. Neodymium isotopic studies suggest that iron formations are usually from continental sources, meaning that dissolved Fe and Fe^{2+} had to be transported during continental erosion. A rise in atmospheric oxygen prevents Fe transport, so the lack of iron formations may have been the result of an increase in oxygen. The fourth oxygenation event, roughly 0.6 Ga, is based on modeled rates of sulfur isotopes from marine carbonate-associated sulfates. An increase (near doubled concentration) of sulfur isotopes, which is suggested by these models, would require an increase in the oxygen content of the deep oceans.

Between 650 and 550 Ma there were three increases in ocean oxygen levels, this period is the fifth oxygenation stage. One of the reasons indicating this period to be an oxygenation event is the increase in redox-sensitive molybdenum in black shales. The sixth event occurred between 360 and 260 Ma and was identified by models suggesting shifts in the balance of ^{34}S in sulfates and ^{13}C in carbonates, which were strongly influenced by an increase in atmospheric oxygen.

== Proxies ==
Granites and detrital zircons have notably similar and episodic appearances in the rock record. Their fluctuations correlate with Precambrian supercontinent cycles. The U–Pb zircon dates from orogenic granites are among the most reliable aging determinants.

Some issues exist with relying on granite sourced zircons, such as a lack of evenly globally sourced data and the loss of granite zircons by sedimentary coverage or plutonic consumption. Where granite zircons are less adequate, detrital zircons from sandstones appear and make up for the gaps. These detrital zircons are taken from the sands of major modern rivers and their drainage basins. Oceanic magnetic anomalies and paleomagnetic data are the primary resources used for reconstructing continent and supercontinent locations back to roughly 150 Ma.

== See also ==
- List of paleocontinents
- Superocean
- Chronology of continents
