= Paleocontinent =

Major landmass in the geological past

A paleocontinent or palaeocontinent is a distinct area of continental crust that existed as a major landmass in the geological past. There have been many different landmasses throughout Earth's time. They range in sizes since some are just a collection of small microcontinents, and others are large conglomerates of crust. As time progresses, and sea levels rise and fall more crust can be exposed, which makes way for larger landmasses. The continents of the past shaped the evolution of organisms on Earth and contributed to the climate of the globe as well. As landmasses break apart, species are separated and those that were once the same now have evolved to their new climate. The constant movement of these landmasses greatly determines the distribution of organisms on Earth's surface.

That is evident with how similar fossils are found on distant continents. Also, as continents move, mountain-building events (orogenies) occur, causing a shift in the global climate as new rock is exposed. There is more exposed rock at higher elevations, which causes glacial ice expansion and an overall cooler global climate. The movement of the continents greatly affects the overall dispersal of organisms throughout the world and the trend in climate throughout Earth's history.

Examples include Laurentia, Baltica and Avalonia, which collided together during the Caledonian orogeny to form the Old Red Sandstone paleocontinent of Laurussia. Another example includes a collision that occurred during the late Pennsylvanian and the early Permian, when there the two continents of Tarimsky and Kirghiz-Kazakh collidedé that was caused by their askew convergence when the paleoceanic basin closed.

== Examples ==
The examples below are condensed to portray a brief overview of several paleocontinents. The time scales are on the order of millions of years ago (mya).

=== Gondwana ===
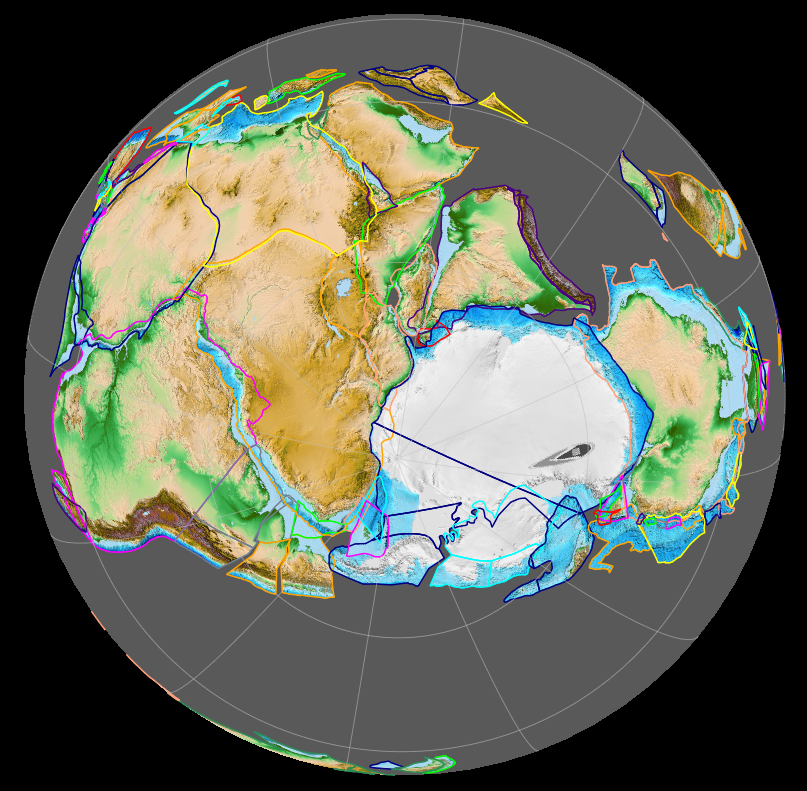
Gondwana: Triassic Period, 200 mya

==== Location ====
Gondwana was located in the Southern Hemisphere, with the land mass that makes up what is now the part of Antarctica that is closest to the South Pole. The continent reached from just above the equator to the South Pole. In modern times, South America and Africa are the closest continents to the equator, and Northern Africa crosses it.

==== Time period ====
600-180 mya, Precambrian - Jurassic Period.

==== Formation ====
Gondwana was made of present-day South America, Africa, Arabia, India, Antarctica, Australia, and Madagascar. The continent had become fully formed by the late Precambrian period, 600 million years ago. It was an amalgamation of all of today's continents in the Southern Hemisphere. Gondwana lasted in many different time periods and was a part of other supercontinents like Pangea.

==== Demise ====
Gondwana broke up in distinct stages. The continent started to split during the Jurassic Period around 180 million years ago. The first event was the separation of the western half of Gondwana, which includes Africa and South America, from its eastern half, which includes Antarctica, Australia, Madagascar, and India. Next, 40 million years later, South America and Africa began to split, which began to open up the Atlantic Ocean. Also around then, India and Madagascar began to detach from Australia and Antarctica. The separation created the Indian Ocean. Lastly, during the Cretaceous, India and Madagascar began to split, and Australia and Antarctica began to detach from each other.

==== Life ====
The life on Gondwana has changed throughout its existence. Gondwana was a smaller piece of Rodinia and stayed together all the way until the breakup of Pangea. That allowed Gondwana to host almost all species that have ever lived on Earth. Gondwana also was a part of some great mass extinction events. During the Ordovician, sea levels rose so much that the entire Gondwana continent was covered, when marine life was dominant.

Also, vertebrates started to make an appearance in the fossil record. Terrestrial species started to become more prominent in the Silurian, but during the Devonian, modern fish and shark species began to diversify, and terrestrial vegetation begun colonizing the continent, as organic soil accumulation can be detected.

Amniotic eggs started to evolve, as more terrestrial land became available with the rising land masses and lowering sea levels. During the Permian extinction, almost all marine species were lost, along with some terrestrial species. This event gave rise to terrestrial species, such as reptiles, dinosaurs, and small mammals.

==== Climate ====
Gondwana experienced a variety of climates as it has been a land mass from 600 million years ago in the Precambrian to the Early Jurassic with the breakup of Pangea. In the Cambrian, there was a warmer and milder climate because most continental crust was closer to the equator and not the poles. The continent endured an ice age during the Ordovician period and deglaciation was still occurring during the Silurian period. The climate started to become more humid and tropical throughout the globe and there was a lack of seasonality. The climate began to change again during the Mesozoic, this time period was dominated by a very large and lengthy monsoon season, because of Pangea. Once Pangea began to break apart the climate started to cool, but Gondwana was already being broken apart.

=== Laurentia ===
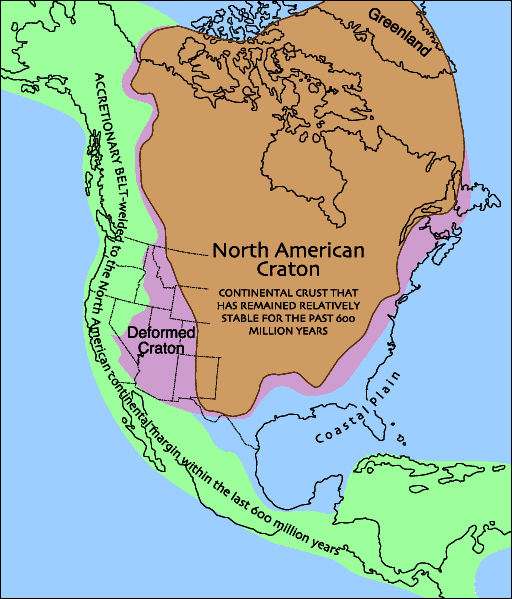
Laurentia, in its current context.

==== Location ====
The location of Laurentia has changed throughout time. During the late Proterozoic, it could be found surrounded by Siberia, South Africa, Australia-Antarctica, and Amazonia-Baltica. During the time of the supercontinent Gondwana, Laurentia was smashed in between Eastern and Western Gondwana, but when Gondwana attached to Laurussia to form Pangea, Laurentia moved and became closer to Northern Africa.

==== Time period ====
4 bya-present day, Precambrian-Quaternary.

==== Formation ====
Laurentia is the North American craton. It is one of the largest and oldest cratons dating back to Precambrian times. The craton itself includes the Canadian and Greenland shields, as well as the interior basin of North America, and the craton can also include the Cordilleran foreland of the Southwestern United States. The craton itself formed in deep time, the early Proterozoic age of the Earth and has stayed coherent since then. It formed through many different orogenies and the suture zones that they create.

The smaller land masses were made of Archean crust and belts of Early Proterozoic island arcs. Laurentia has been a part of many supercontinents throughout its time. The formation of Laurentia is similar to the formation of Eurasia.

==== Demise ====
Laurentia is presently still coherent and still a continental craton and now goes by the name North America. The craton can be found stretching from Alberta, Canada to the eastern coast of both Canada and the United States. The craton stretches from the Southeastern United States to Greenland. The western border of Laurentia can be found on the eastern side of the Rocky Mountains.

==== Life ====
The sea level rose in the Cambrian period, which gave rise to marine invertebrates, which flourished. Life in the Ordovician continued to be dominated by marine animals and vegetation. Also, vertebrates started to make up a portion of the animals on Earth. However, sponges and algae were still dominant. Marine animals were the most dominant, but terrestrial species started to appear at the end of the Ordovician. Life in the Silurian was still dominated by marine species, but terrestrial species are much more prominent than before.

When Laurentia moved into the Devonian period, fish began to diversify, and life had begun colonizing land since organic soil accumulation can then be detected. More modern fish began to develop as time went on, with the addition of shark diversification. Also, amniotic eggs started to evolve as more terrestrial land became available because of the rising land masses. The next event was the Permian extinction, when almost all species in the oceans died off along, with many terrestrial species. That gave rise to terrestrial animals such as reptiles, dinosaurs, and small mammals. At the end of the new era was a mass extinction of dinosaurs and reptiles, which led mammals to flourish as they could take over many of the niches that became vacant.

==== Climate ====
Laurentia experienced a variety of climates, as it has been a land mass for billions of years. The craton experienced an ice age during the late Proterozoic and another during the Ordovician period. The Cambria had no ice age and was slightly warmer, as most continents avoided the poles, which gave the land a milder climate. Deglaciation was still occurring during the Silurian period after the ice age of the Ordovician. The climate started to become more humid and tropical throughout the Earth. There were not many seasons.

The climate began to change when Laurentia entered the Mesozoic Era, which was dominated by a very large and lengthy monsoon season because of Pangea. At the end of the Cretaceous, the seasons started to return, and the Earth entered another ice age.

=== Pangea ===
Pangea

==== Location ====
The continent spanned from 85° N to 90° S. Pangea was centered over the equator and encompassed area from the north to the south poles. The southeastern part of present-day North America and the northern region of what is now Africa intersected the equator. Today's Eastern Asia was farther north and Antarctica and Australia were farther south.

==== Time period ====
299–272 mya to 200 mya, Early Permian-Early Jurassic.

==== Formation ====
Pangea was created by the continent of Gondwanaland and the continent of Laurussia. During the Carboniferous period the two continents came together to form the supercontinent of Pangea. The mountain building events that happened at this time created the Appalachian Mountains and the Variscan Belt of Central Europe. However, not all landmasses on Earth had attached themselves onto Pangea. It took until the late Permian until the Siberian land mass collided with Pangea. The only land mass that was not be part of Pangea was the former North and South China plates, which created a much smaller land mass in the ocean. There was a massive ocean that encompassed the world; it is called Panthalassa because most of the continental crust was sutured together into one giant continent, which had a giant ocean to match.

==== Demise ====
Pangea broke apart after 70 million years. The supercontinent was torn apart through fragmentation, when parts of the main landmass would break off in stages. Two main events that led to the dispersal of Pangea. The first was a passive rifting event that occurred in the Triassic period. The rifting event caused the Atlantic Ocean to form. The other event was an active rifting event. It happened in the Lower Jurassic and caused the opening of the Indian Ocean. The break-up took 17 million years to complete.

==== Life ====
Pangea formed roughly 20 million years before the Permian Extinction, when over 95% of all marine species and 70% of terrestrial species were lost. The Triassic period of Pangea became a time of recovery from the Permian Extinction. The recovery included the rise of sea levels, which created extensive shallow oceanic shelves for large marine reptiles. The recovery period had terrestrial animals flourish and land reptiles diversify and flourish, along with the appearance of dinosaurs. The dinosaurs would become what would characterize the life during the Jurassic and the Cretaceous periods. At the end of the Triassic and the beginning of the Jurassic periods, small shrew-like mammals first appeared which came from reptiles.

==== Climate ====
The main characteristic of Pangea's climate was that its position on Earth helped start a cycle of megamonsoonal circulation. The monsoons reached their maximum strength during the Triassic period of the Mesozoic. During the late Carboniferous, peat was formed in what is currently Europe and the eastern areas of North America. The wetter, swamp-like conditions necessary to form peat were contrasted with the dry conditions on the Colorado Plateau. Near the end of the Carboniferous, the region of Pangea centered on the equator became drier. In the Permian, the dryness contrasted with seasonal rainfall, and that type of climate became more normal and widespread on the continent.

However, during the Triassic, the Colorado Plateau started to regain some moisture, and there was a shift in wind direction. Around the same time, parts of what is now Australia were at higher latitudes and much drier and seasonal in character. At the start of the Jurassic, the megamonsoon started to fall apart, as drying started in Gondwana and the southern portion of Laurasia.

=== Rodinia ===
==== Location ====
Rodinia was centered on the Equator and reached from 60° N to 60° S.

==== Time period ====
1.2-1 bya to 800-850 mya, Proterozoic Eon - end of Precambrian.

==== Formation ====
It was the first supercontinent to form on Earth, when all of the continental crust on Earth came together and formed one giant land mass. The land mass was surrounded by an even larger ocean, known as Mirovia. There were about four smaller continents, which collided and came together to form Rodinia. The event is called the Grenville Orogeny. Mountains were built along the places the ofwere continents collided. The continental crust was not very dense and so neither continent would sink or subduct. That caused the formation of fold and thrust belts, similar to the Himalayas today.

==== Demise ====
Rodinia lasted for 250 mya and then began to come apart between 850 and 800 mya. The continent began to break apart at a single point but then fractured and ripped open in three different directions. Two of the three rifts that were created were successful, but the third failed. The breaking-up Rodinia caused the formation of Gondwana or Gondwanaland and Laurentia. The break-up created many shallow coastal shelves, which had not been there. The shelves were nutrient-rich, which is thought to have led to the diversification of vegetative and non-vegetative life on Earth. The shelves in particular were the area where animal life is said to have started. The name Rodinia also alludes to thiat since it means in Russian means 'to give birth', in this case to animal life on Earth.

==== Climate ====
The climate at the end of Rodinia's existence was cold, which is thought to be the start of the first snowball Earth period. Rodinia already had some glaciation, but as it tore apart, less dense rock began to rise, which caused more land area to be at higher elevations and thus encouraged more ice to stick. However, Rodinia was a time during which Earth's atmosphere was inactive.

Also, the atmosphere had little oxygen because Rodinia's land surface was too harsh of an environment for land plants to flourishé The atmosphere was devoid of oxygen, and the ozone layer was much less extensive, which is attributed to the harsh land environment.

== See also ==
- Continental fragment – Part of a continent broken from its main mass
- Geological history of Earth
- List of paleocontinents
- Prehistoric ocean – List of Earth's former oceans
- Terrane – Fragment of crust formed on one tectonic plate and accreted to another
