= Indian Shield =

Geological feature

The Indian Shield is part of the Indian Craton and occupies two-thirds of the southern Indian peninsula.

The shield has remained relatively stable since its formation, over 3.5 billion years ago. It is bounded on the west, south and east by the present day coastline and Phanerozoic sediment cover. On the north, it is bounded by the Proterozoic Province. In the northeast, it is bounded by the Godavari graben, preserving the Precambrian pakhal rocks and Gondwana sediments. The important components that make up the shield are:

- The Dharwar craton with its characteristic Archaean volcanic - plutonic belts surrounded by the vast gneissic terrain.
- The southern granulite - gneiss terrain of Tamil Nadu - Kerala.
- The Eastern Ghat Mobile Belt (EGMB) along the east coast.
- The intra-cratonic "Purana" basins with thick sequences of platform facies rocks and/or rift related sediments.
