= Permo-Carboniferous =

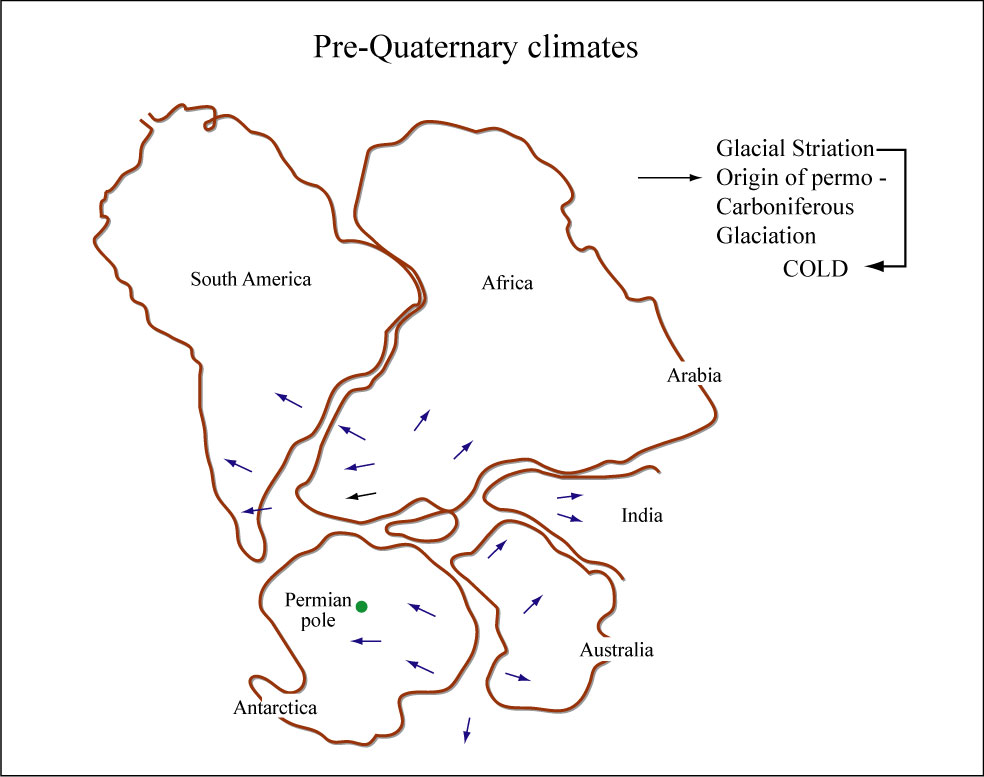
A map shows the motion of glaciers across all the proto-continents, radiating out from a common point.

The Permo-Carboniferous is the time period including the latter parts of the Carboniferous and early part of the Permian period. Permo-Carboniferous rocks are in places not differentiated because of the presence of transitional fossils, and also where no conspicuous stratigraphic break is present.

Permo-Carboniferous time, about 300 million years ago, was a period of significant glaciation. The widespread distribution of Permo-Carboniferous glacial sediments in South America, Africa, Madagascar, Arabia, India, Antarctica and Australia was one of the major pieces of evidence for the theory of continental drift, and led ultimately to the concept of a super-continent, Pangaea. Glacial activity spanned virtually the whole of Carboniferous and Early Permian time. Toward the end of the Carboniferous, around 290 million years ago, Gondwana, the southern part of Pangaea, was located near the south pole. Glacial centres expanded across the continents, producing glacial tillites and striations in pre-existing rocks. A complex centre of glaciation migrated across South America, Antarctica and South Africa between about 350 and 240 Ma. Chronological difficulties complicate the task of charting the evolution of the ice sheet over this interval. The Permo-Carboniferous ice sheet was so extensive that it would occupy a circle spanning 50 degrees of latitude centered on the pole.
