= Sclavia Craton =

Late Archean supercraton

The Sclavia Craton is a late Archean supercraton thought to be parental to the Slave and Wyoming Cratons in North America, the Dharwar Craton in southern India, and the Zimbabwe Craton in southern Africa. Sclavia was proposed by Bleeker 2003 who estimated the number of Archean cratons to be about 35; cratonic fragments which he suggested were derived from a single or a few supercratons.

The break-up of Sclavia, and possibly other continents or supercratons, can be linked to a global pulse of magmatic activity around 2.33–2.1 Gya probably caused by increased mantle plume activity. Related results of this mantle activity include the 2.3 Ga-old Precambrian dyke swarms in the Dharwar Craton in southern India which were emplaced in only five million years. Similar swarms have been found in what is today Antarctica, Australia, Finland, Greenland, and North America.

There is growing evidences that support that the Slave and Dharwar cratons shared a common history through the Archean but the exact configuration of the Archean supercraton from which they were derived is unknown.

Kenorland, a proposed supercontinent, is a "one-piece" alternative to three separate supercratons: Superia, Vaalbara, and Sclavia.
