= Dharwar Craton =

Part of the Indian Shield in south India

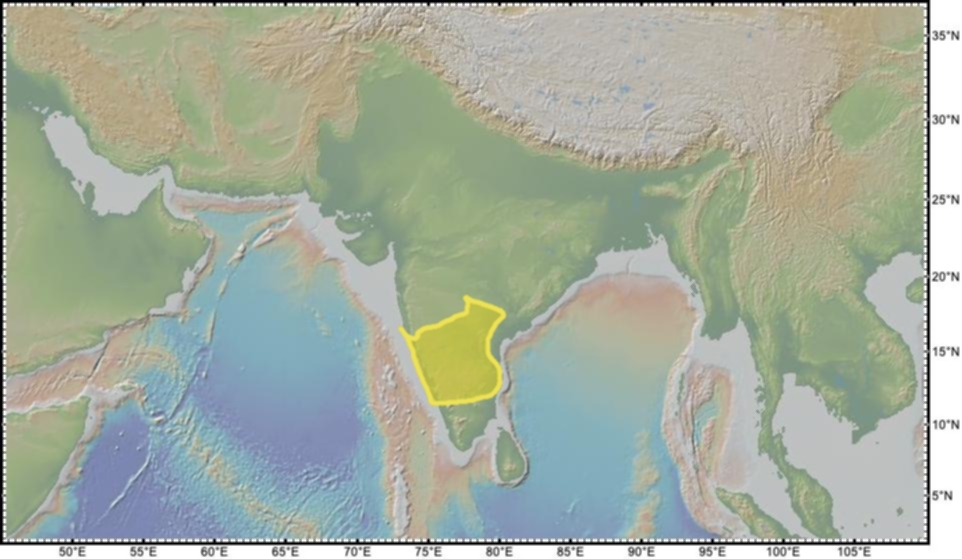
The location map of the Dharwar Craton. The shaded area represents the Dharwar Craton. Generated from GeoMapApp (Ryan et al., 2009).

The Dharwar Craton is an Archean continental crust craton formed between 3.6 and 2.5 billion years ago (Ga), which is located in southern India and considered the oldest part of the Indian peninsula.

Studies in the 2010s suggest that the craton can be separated into three crustal blocks since they show different accretionary history (i.e., the history of block collisions). The craton includes the western, central and eastern blocks and the three blocks are divided by several shear zones.

The lithologies of the Dharwar Craton are mainly TTG (Tonalite-trondhjemite-granodiorite) gneisses, volcanic-sedimentary greenstone sequences and calc-alkaline granitoids. The western Dharwar Craton contains the oldest basement rocks, with greenstone sequences between 3.0 and 3.4 Ga, whereas the central block of the craton mainly contains migmatitic TTG gneisses, and the eastern block contains 2.7 Ga greenstone belts and calc-alkaline plutons.

The formation of the basement rock of the Dharwar Craton was created by intraplate hotspots (i.e., volcanic activities caused by mantle plumes from the core-mantle boundary), the melting of subducted oceanic crust and the melting of thickened oceanic arc crust. The continuous melting of oceanic arc crust and mantle upwelling generated the TTG and sanukitoid plutons over the Dharwar Craton.

== Overview of the regional geology ==
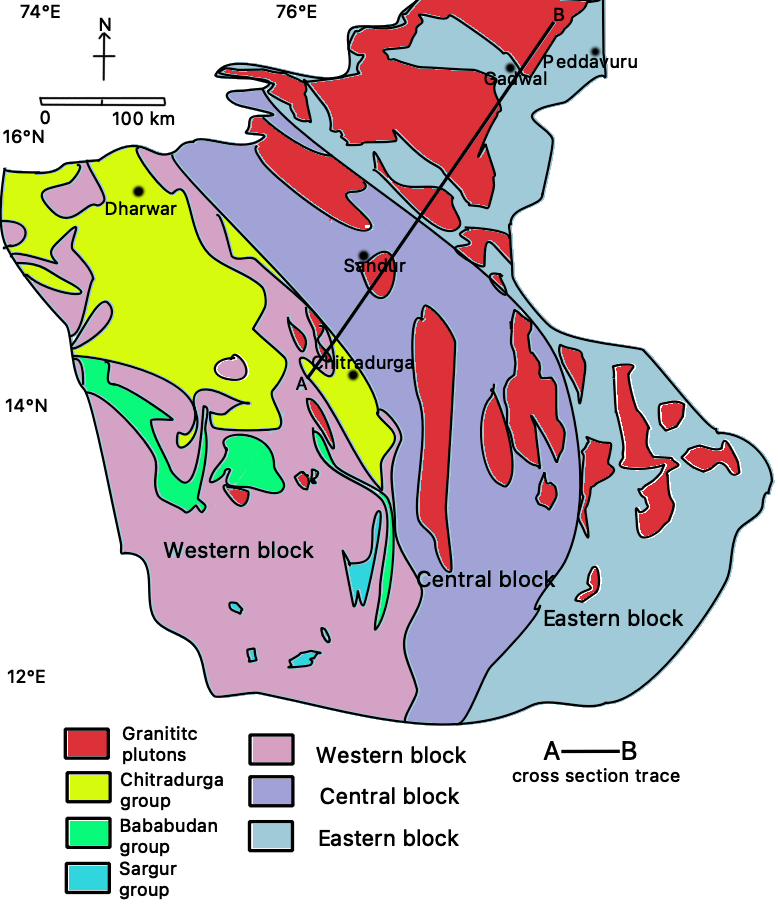
Simplified geological map of the Dharwar Craton, which shows the western, central and eastern blocks. Modified from Jayananda et al., (2018).

The Dharwar Craton located in southern India, is geographically surrounded by the Arabian Sea, the Deccan Trap, the Eastern Ghats Mobile Belt and the Southern Granulite Belt.

Traditionally, the Dharwar Craton includes the western block and eastern block. The mylonite zone at the eastern boundary of the Chitradurga greenstone belt is the margin between the western block and the eastern block. The Chitradurga greenstone belt is an elongated linear supracrustal belt which is 400 km long from North to South.

Cratonisation is an important process to form a craton with sufficient and stable continental masses. In terms of the ages of the blocks, the western blocks is older with a cratonisation age around 3.0 Ga while the eastern block is younger with the cratonisation age around 2.5 Ga.

Simplified stratigraphic column of the Dharwar Craton
Sargur group (3.3-3.0 Ga)
- The Sargur group mainly consist of ultramafic-mafic rocks like komatiite and basalt, as well as some quartzite and chert.
- It is dominated in the western block from Paleoarchean to Mesoarchean.
Dharwar supergroup (2.9-2.6 Ga)
- The Dharwar Supergroup can be divided into two groups as well, including the Bababudan group with older age and the Chitradurga group with a younger age.
- It is dominated in the western block from Paleoarchean to Mesoarchean.
Kolar group (2.7 Ga)
- Since the eastern block cratonised later than the western block, the eastern block is dominated by Kolar greenstone belts.
- The Kolar-type greenstone mainly contains some metabasalts and felsic volcanic rocks.
Granitic plutons (2.7-2.5 Ga)
- The granitoids include high-magnesium sanukitoids and high-potassium granites.

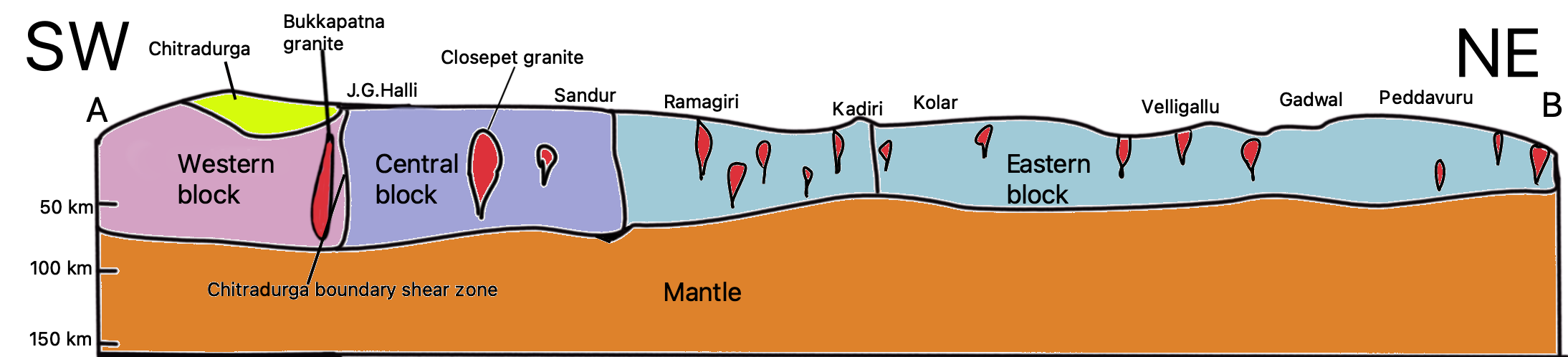
Simplified cross-section of the Dharwar Craton from SW to NE, showing the shear zone and the granitic intrusions. Modified from Jayananda et al., (2018).

== Lithologies ==
=== TTG gneisses ===
TTG rocks are intrusive rocks with a granitic composition of quartz and feldspar but contain less potassium feldspar. In Archean craton, TTG rocks are usually present in batholiths formed by plate subduction and melting. Two kinds of gneisses can be found on the Dharwar Craton, which includes the typical TTG-type gneisses (i.e., traditional TTG with a major component of quartz and plagioclase) and the dark grey TTG banded gneisses (relatively more potassium feldspar than typical TTG gneisses):

Blocks	Associated group	Main TTG type	Characteristics
western block	Sargur Group	typical TTG gneisses	some of the TTG are with minor granitic intrusions
central block	Kolar Group	transitional TTG gneisses (contain both typical TTG and dark grey banded gneisses)	the TTG shows foliation; the abundance of the weakly foliated TTG gneisses decreases gradually from the west to the east; the abundance of the dark grey banded gneisses with younger age increases gradually from the west to the east
eastern block	Kolar Group	banded gneisses	it contains less TTG than those of the western and central blocks

=== Volcanic-sedimentary greenstone sequences ===
Greenstone is metamorphosed mafic to ultramafic volcanic rock that formed in volcanic eruptions in the early stage of Earth formation. The volcanic-sedimentary greenstone sequence occupies the majority of the Archean crustal record, which is about 30%. The western block comprises the greenstone sequences with adequate sediments, while the central block and the eastern block comprise the greenstone sequences with adequate volcanic rocks but minor sediments.

Blocks	Associated group(s)	Composition of the volcanic greenstone	Characteristics
Western block	Sargur group and Dharwar Supragroup	ultramafic komatiite with interlayered sediments	rocks were formed in calm and shallow water environments; basaltic flows, conglomerate and some felsic volcanics can be found in the greenstone of the Dharwar Supragroup
Central block	Kolar group	basalts with minor ultramafic komatiite	the volcanic rocks comprised with minor sediment and some felsic rocks
Eastern block	Kolar group	basalts with minor ultramafic komatiite	basalts are with high magnesium; the greenstone contains interlayered sediments like carbonate

=== Sanukitoids (Calc-alkaline granitoids) ===
Sanukitoids are granitoids with high-magnesium composition that are commonly formed by plate collision events in Archean. In the Dharwar Craton, there is no sanukitoid record in the western block. However, there are a lot of granitoid intrusions in the central block, which become less in the eastern block.

Blocks	Rock units intruded by granitoids	Main composition	Characteristics
Central block	TTG gneisses and volcanic greenstone	monzogranite and monzodiorite	they are comprised with pink phenocrysts.; granitoid intrusions form plutons over the block that are north–south trending; the largest pluton in the central block is the Closepet Batholith.
Eastern block	TTG gneisses and volcanic greenstone	monzogranite and monzodiorite	The granitoids are associated with the diatexites (i.e., the granite was mixed with older rocks due to partial melting), indicating there was intense metamorphism which causes recrystallization of minerals

=== Anatectic granites ===
Anatectic granite is a kind of rock formed by the partial melting of the pre-existing crustal rock, which is relatively younger than the TTG and greenstone in the Dharwar Craton. The granites usually cut across the older rocks.

Blocks	Rock units intruded by granites	Main composition	Characteristics
Western block	TTG gneisses and volcanic greenstone	granite with high-potassium content	they occupy the ductile shear zone over the TTG gneisses, forming cross-cutting dykes and veins
Central block	TTG gneisses and volcanic greenstone	granite with high-potassium content	they occupy the ductile shear zone over the TTG gneisses, forming cross-cutting dykes and veins
Eastern block	TTG gneisses and volcanic greenstone	granite with high-potassium content	they occupy a large area in the eastern block; in the southern part of the block, many veins and dykes cut across the gneisses; some mafic to ultramafic xenoliths can be found

== Metamorphic record ==
When the rocks were under subductions, they experienced high temperature and pressure leading to the chemical changes and textural changes of rocks (i.e., metamorphism). The mineral assemblages of the metamorphic rocks can tell us how high the temperature and pressure are when they are under the peak metamorphism (the progress with the highest pressure and temperature). The metamorphic rocks in the Dharwar Craton usually recorded the mineral assemblages from amphibolite facies to granulite facies:

Blocks	Pressure-Temperature conditions	Metamorphic facies	Records
Western block	Progressive increase from the N to the S	From the greenschist facies to the hornblende-granulite facies	Holenarsipur greenstone belt: mineral assemblages: kyanite-garnet; pressure: 6–8 Kb; temperature range: 500–675 °C; Gundlupet region: mineral assemblages: garnet-hornblende-clinopyroxene; temperature range: 650-750 °C
Central block	Progressive increase from the N to the S	From the greenschist facies to the granulite facies	Pavagada region, the central part of the central block: mineral assemblages: sillimanite-spinel-quartz; temperature condition: ultrahigh; B.R Hills region: mineral assemblages: amphibolite-granulite; pressure: 5–9 Kb; temperature range: 600–775 °C
Eastern block	Poorly understood	Poorly understood	Hutti greenstone belt: mineral assemblages: amphibolite; Krishnagiri-Dharmapuri region, the southern part of the eastern block: mineral assemblages: amphibolite-granulite; temperature range: 650 to 800 °C

== Archean crust accretions ==
Accretions mean the collisions between plates leading to the plate subduction. Crust accretions are important in the Dharwar Craton since the continuous volcanic eruptions caused by accretions led to the formation of Archean felsic continent crust.

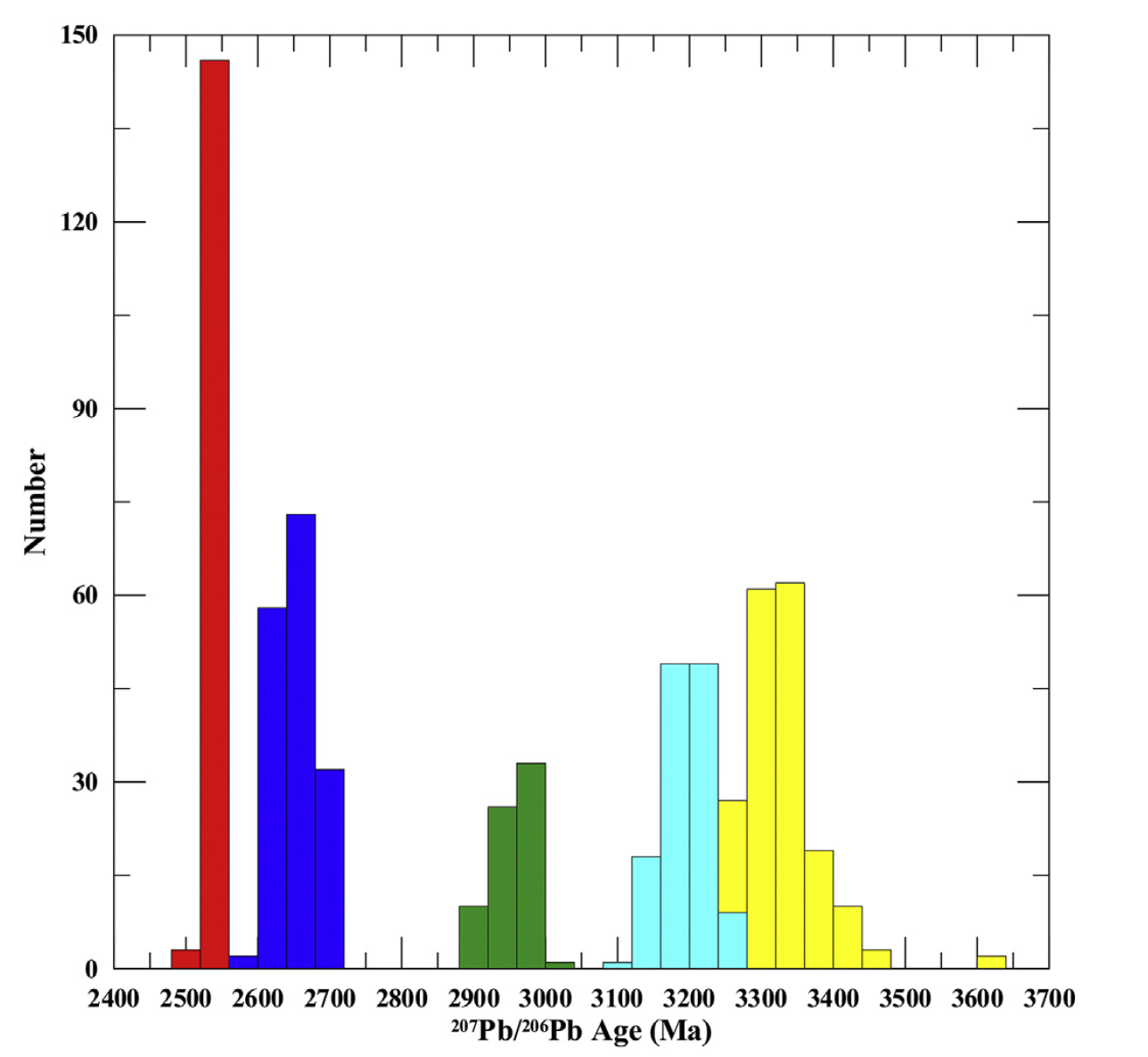
The graph shows the distribution of zircons according to their U-Pb ages. It shows the 5 major crustal accretion events with the ranges of age 3450–3300, 3230–3200, 3150–3000, 2700–2600 and 2560–2520 Ma. Modified from Jayananda et al., (2015, 2018).

For finding when the Archean crust accretions happened, the parent-daughter isotopes dating, like uranium-lead (U-Pb) decay could be used to find out the ages of the events.

According to the zircon U-Pb ages of the TTG gneisses from the Dharwar Craton, there were 5 major accretion events leading to the formation of the Archean felsic continental crust. The events occurred with the ranges of age 3450–3300, 3230–3200, 3150–3000, 2700–2600 and 2560–2520 million years ago (Ma).

The western block records the two earliest crust accretion events, that happened in 3450 Ma and 3230 Ma. The rates of the continental growth of the two events are fast since the events led to the widespread of greenstone volcanism.

The central block records 4 major accretion events, that occurred in 3375 Ma, 3150 Ma, 2700 Ma and 2560 Ma. The isotopic data suggests that the scale of the continental growth due to felsic crust accretion was large during 2700–2600 Ma and 2560–2520 Ma, leading to the large-scale greenstone volcanism at that time.

The eastern block records the 2 latest major accretion events occurring in 2700 Ma and 2560 Ma with massive continental growth.

== Crustal reworking events ==
Crustal reworking means the old rocks (protoliths) are destroyed and regenerated into new rocks. The continental crust is relatively old if the crust experienced crustal reworking events. For the rocks that experienced crustal reworking, minerals like zircon, which is difficult to melt, are preserved in the reworked rocks. Some new zircons with a younger age would be formed in the reworking events.

The crustal reworking events happened in the time range of 3100–3000 Ma. All 3 crustal blocks record the crustal reworking events in 2520 Ma due to the final assembly of the Superia supercontinent.

For the western block, there are two reworking events. The first event happened in 3100–3000 Ma accounting to the emplacement of granite. The second reworking event led to the emplacement of 2640–2600 Ma of granites.

For the central block, the event happened in 3140 Ma is considered as the earliest crustal reworking due to the TTG accretion event between 3230 and 3140 Ma in the central block of the craton.

For the eastern block, the second highest-temperature reworking event was recorded in the centre of the block, which happened in 2640–2620 Ma. The reworking event is related to the greenstone volcanism of the TTG accretion event in 2700 Ma.

== Formation and evolution ==
=== Intraplate hotspot model ===
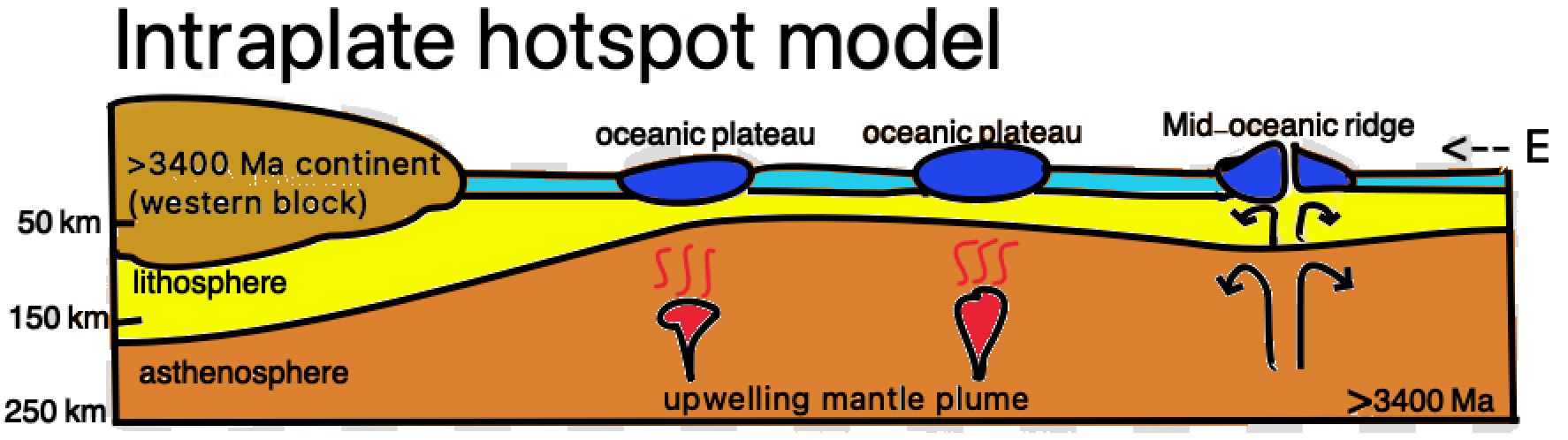
The annotated diagram of the intraplate hotspot model before 3400 Ma, forming the oceanic plateaus. Modified from Jayananda et al., (2018).

Before 3400 Ma, the magma upwelling from the mantle led to the intraplate hotspot setting. The upwelling magma formed the oceanic plateaus with komatiites and komatiitic basalts in the oceanic crust.

=== Two-stage melting of oceanic crust ===
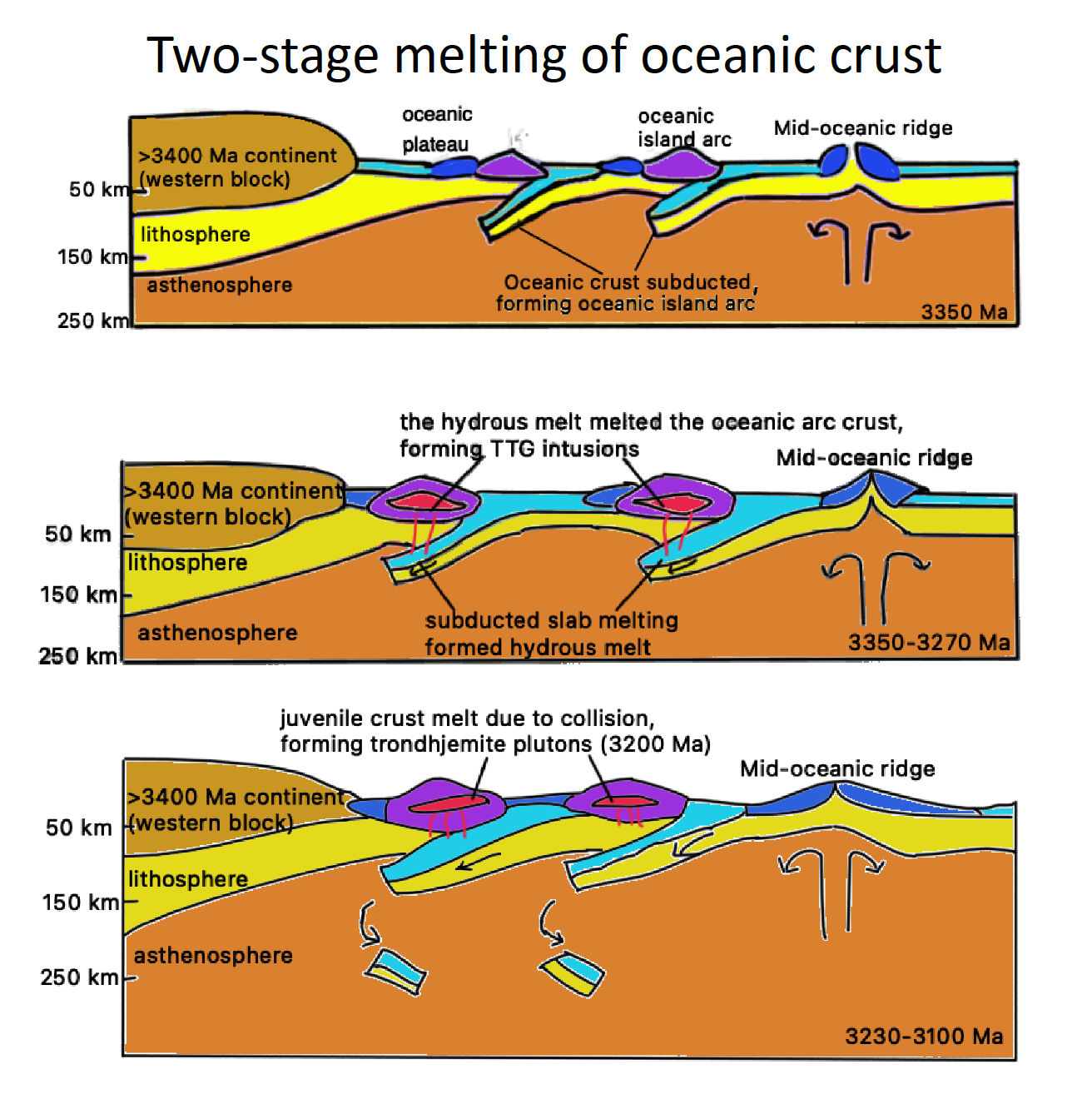
The evolutionary diagram of the two-stage melting of the oceanic crust during 3350-3100 Ma, forming the TTG plutons. Modified from Jayananda et al., (2018) and Tushipokla et al., (2013).

After the mantle plume hotspots were formed, the tectonic setting was followed by the two-stage melting, which include the melting of the subducted oceanic crust and the melting of the thickened oceanic arc crust.

In 3350 Ma, due to the ridge push from the oceanic spreading centres (mid-oceanic ridges), some oceanic crust subducted under the mantle. The subduction led to the melting of the subducted crust and formed magma that rose to the oceanic crust and formed oceanic island arc crust.

During 3350–3270 Ma, the mafic to ultramafic hydrous melt formed by the slab melting melted the base of the thickened oceanic arc crust, which formed the TTG melt, as well as magmatic protoliths of TTGs in the oceanic arc crust.

During 3230–3100 Ma, the continuous collision of the oceanic island arc crust, the TTG and oceanic plateaus, that are formed in the previous stage, caused the melting of the juvenile crust in the oceanic island arc, which generated trondhjemite plutons in 3200 Ma. The trondhjemite emplacement generated heat and fluid that led to the melting that made the low-density TTG crust rose while the high-density greenstone volcanics sank, which developed the dome-keel structures between the TTG and greenstone.

=== Stage of transitional TTGs ===
The transitional TTGs, which were recorded in the central and eastern blocks, was formed during 2700–2600 Ma. The transitional TTGs are relatively enriched in incompatible elements. The enrichment of the incompatible elements could be account for the high-angle subduction and the chemical interaction between the mantle wedge and the melt from the subducted crust.

During the 2700 Ma, the central and eastern block of the Dharwar Craton had developed into microcontinents. The weathering and erosion of the microcontinents led to a large amount of detrital input to the ocean floor and subduction zone. Therefore, the subducted slab with a large amount of sediment brought incompatible elements into the mantle due to a high-angle subduction. The mantle wedge interacted with the slab, leading to the partial enrichment of the incompatible elements in the wedge and generated mafic to intermediate magma. The mafic magma rose and accumulated under the oceanic arc crust, leading to the partial melting of the thickened, incompatible element enriched arc crust and their magma mixed to form the transitional TTGs during 2700–2600 Ma.

=== Shifting from oceanic crust melting to mantle melting ===
After the transitional TTG accretion, the inflexible subducted oceanic crust broke and fell into the asthenosphere, leading to the mantle upwelling under the pre-existing crust. The upwelling mantle rock rose to the shallow depth and melted the upper mantle to generate intermediate to mafic magma. Then, the magma intruded into the middle part of the crust. It underwent differentiation in magma chambers. The heat from the magma transferred into the surrounding rock leading to the partial melting of gneisses and the formation of calc-alkaline granitoids.

=== Sanukitoid magmatism ===
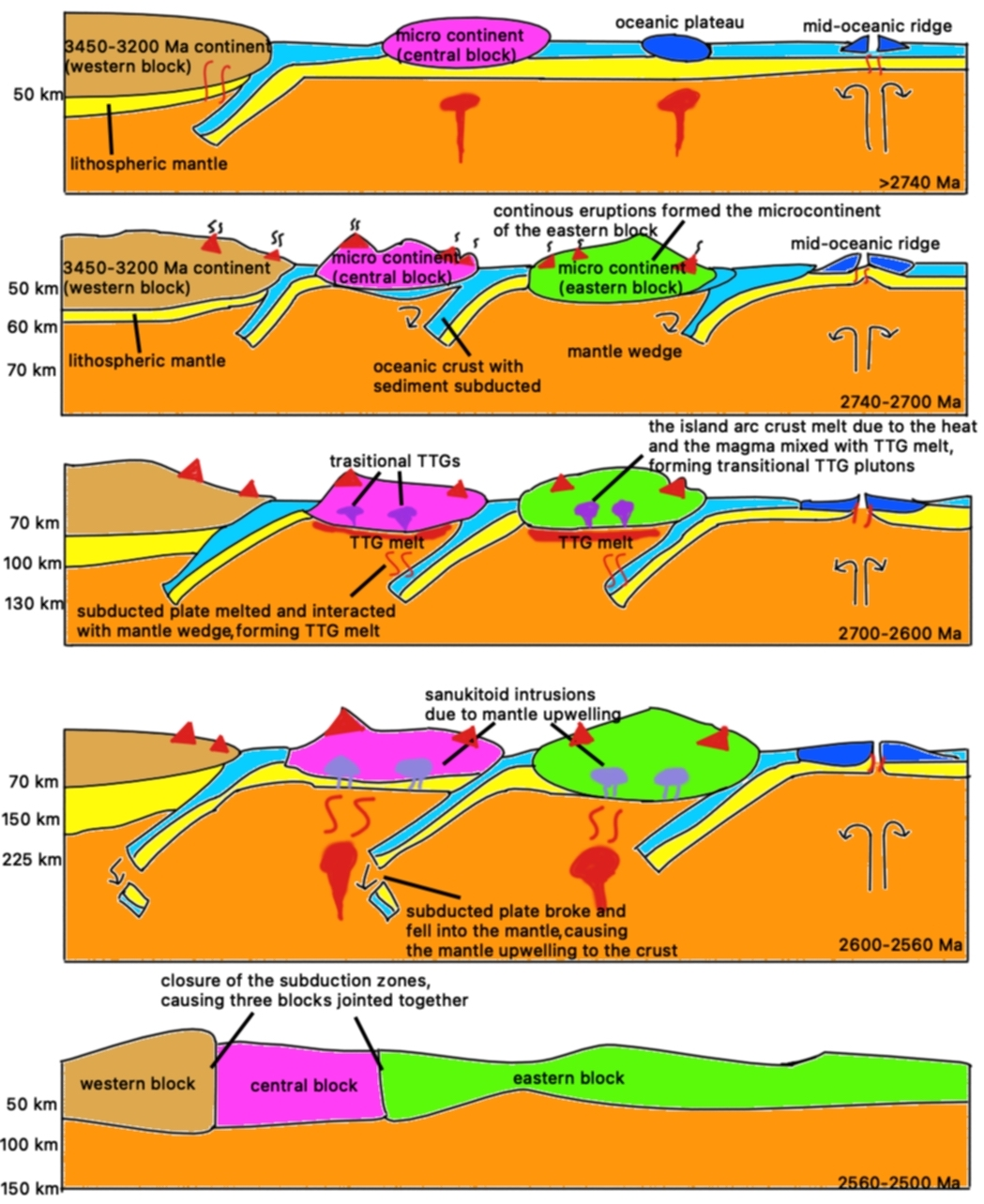
The model showing the transitional TTG accretion, shifting from the melting of oceanic crust to the melting of the mantle, as well as the sanukitoid magmatism during 2740-2500 Ma. Modified from Jayananda et al., (2013, 2018).

Sanukitoids were formed during the Neoarchean magmatic accretion events, that are originated from the mantle with low silicon dioxide and high magnesium. The sanukitoid magma could be generated by either plate subduction or plume setting.

The sanukitoids created by subduction might lead to the chemical alteration of the mantle wedge and the melting of the wedge. The peridotitic mantle wedge was mixed with intermediate to felsic melts. This can be explained by the mixing of the previous TTG melts. The sanukitoids created by plume setting would lead to the sanukitoid intrusions with high magnesium content and low silicon dioxide.

The sanukitoid magmatism is not related to the TTG accretion events during 3450–3000 Ma. The magmatism was followed by the transitional TTG accretion event in 2600 Ma and only occurred in the central and eastern blocks. Since the sanukitoids are enriched in both incompatible and compatible elements, while the TTGs are not, it indicates the appearance of the sanukitoid magmatism shows the tectonic change from melting of oceanic crust to melting of mantle during the period of 2600–2500 Ma.

=== Closure of subduction zones ===
During 2560–2500 Ma, the three blocks joined to form the Dharwar Craton and all the subduction zones closed, followed by the regional metamorphism due to heat release from the mantle during 2535–2500 Ma. The final cratonisation finished in 2400 Ma through slow cooling.

== Implication for global crust history ==
Cratons	Characteristics	Possible relationships with the Dharwar Craton
Bundelkhand Craton	lithologies: TTG gneisses, volcanic-sedimentary greenstone sequences and calc-alkaline granitoids	similar lithologies with the Dharwar Craton; 3 crust generating events (i.e., 3327–3270 Ma, 2700 Ma and 2578–2544 Ma) in the Bundelkhand Craton occurred at the same time as the TTG accretion event and the sanukitoid intrusions of the Dharwar Craton.
North China Craton	the accretion events with the continental growth and assembly of micro-blocks: 2720–2600 Ma and 2550–2500 Ma	similar magmatic events, crustal reworking and high rates of continental growth with the central and eastern blocks of the Dharwar Craton.
Kaapvaal Craton	the zircon ages of the TTG gneisses and granitoids: 3400–3200 Ma and 2650–2620 Ma; the ages of sanukitoids: 2617–2590 Ma	the zircon ages are the same as the TTG gneisses and potassic granitic intrusions from the western block of the Dharwar Craton.; those sanukitoids share the same ages as the 2600 Ma transitional TTGs and the early formed sanukitoids in the central and eastern blocks of the Dharwar craton.
Pilbara Craton	the accretion event : 3500–3220 Ma (with a large number of gneisses and granitoids)	the accretion event occurred at a similar time to the 3450–3200 Ma TTG accretion event in the western Dharwar Craton.; the detrital zircons in the TTG gneisses of the western Dharwar Craton showed the ages of 3700–3800 Ma, which might come from the old crust of the Pilbara Craton.
Yilgarn Craton	the ages of gneisses and granitoids: 2700–2630 Ma	the ages of the gneisses and granitoids corresponded with the transitional TTGs accretion event in the central and eastern blocks of the Dharwar craton.
Tanzania Craton	the U-Pb ages of the basement gneisses: 3234-3140 Ma; the ages of the granitoids and greenstone sequences: 2720-2640 Ma and 2815 Ma	the ages of the basement gneisses may be related to the ages of the detrital zircons and TTG gneisses in the western block of the Dharwar Craton.; the greenstones and granitoids share the same ages with the transitional TTGs and the greenstone sequences in the central and the eastern blocks of the Dharwar Craton.
Antongil Craton	the zircon ages of TTG gneisses: 3320-3231 Ma and 3187-3154 Ma	the crust forming events in the Antongil Craton occurred at the same time with the crustal formation and reworking events in the western block of the Dharwar Craton.

== See also ==
- Subduction zone metamorphism
- Geochronology
- Thermochronology
- Magma differentiation
