= Aseismic ridge =

Geologic feature below some oceans

The Walvis ridge (arrows) extending southwest from Africa, an example of an aseismic ridge

An aseismic ridge is "a long, linear and mountainous structure that crosses the basin floor of some oceans." They do not cause earthquakes.

It is called an "aseismic ridge" because they do not receive seismic activity. As a result, they tend to be stable. They are 700–5,000 kilometers (430–3,110 mi) in length.

Aseismic ridges going towards subduction zones can impact the process of subduction, causing a phenomenon known as flat slab subduction.

== Examples ==
=== Atlantic Ocean ===
- Walvis Ridge

=== Indian Ocean ===
- Eighty Five East Ridge
- Ninety East Ridge

=== Pacific Ocean ===
- Carnegie Ridge
- Northern ocean
- Lomnosov Ridge

== See also ==
- Mid-ocean ridge
