= Eighty Five East Ridge =

Near-linear, aseismic, age-progressive ridge in the northeastern Indian Ocean

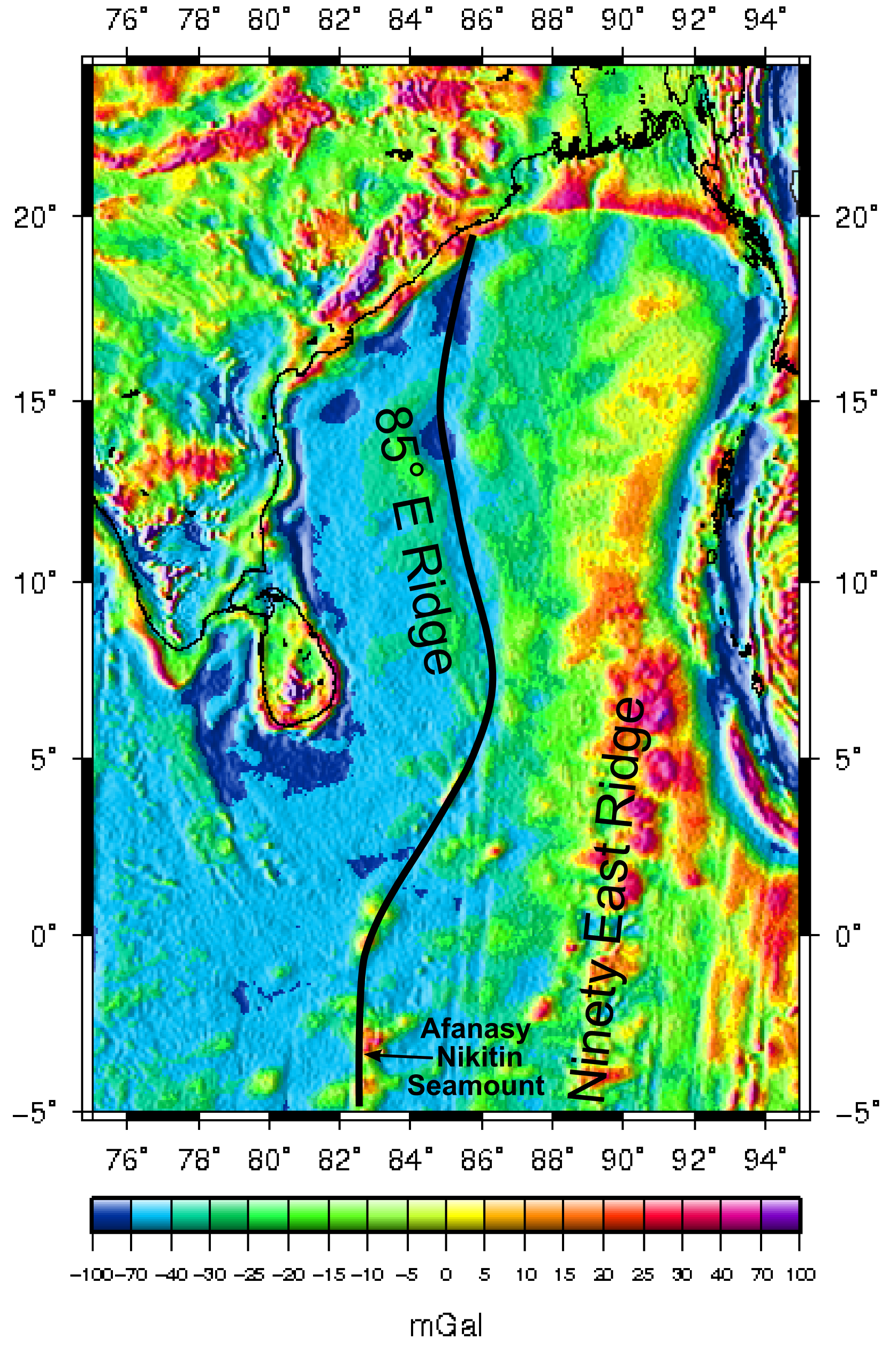
Free-air gravity map of northeastern Indian Ocean showing location of 85°E Ridge

The Eighty Five East Ridge or 85°E Ridge is a near-linear, aseismic, age-progressive ridge in the northeastern Indian Ocean. It is named for its near-parallel strike along the 85th meridian. It is one of two major aseismic ridges in the Bay of Bengal, the other being the Ninety East Ridge. The feature extends from the Mahanadi Basin in the north, off the northeastern coast of India, shifts westwards by about 250 km around 5°N, southeast of Sri Lanka and continues south to the Afanasy Nikitin Seamount in the Central Indian Basin.

No wells have been drilled on the ridge. Samples of the ridge from the Afanasy Nikitin Seamount were ultramafic dunite. Seismic studies have shown that the morphology of the ridge including its depth of occurrence varies along the ridge track and that in general the ridge has been buried beneath sediments deposited since the Oligocene. The ridge is associated with complicated gravity and magnetic signatures. The northern part of the ridge is buried beneath thick sediments of the Bengal Fan and shows a negative gravity anomaly. Ridge structures in the south occasionally rise above the sea floor and are associated with a positive gravity anomaly. The magnetic signatures associated with the ridge are complex, with alternate stripes of strong positive and negative anomalies. Magnetic modelling of the ridge suggests that it was emplaced over a period of rapid geomagnetic reversals whereas the underlying oceanic crust was formed in a normal magnetic field of the Cretaceous normal superchron or "Cretaceous quiet period". The correlation of the magnetization pattern of the ridge and the geomagnetic polarity timescale suggests that the volcanism that created the ridge started ~80 Ma (magnetic chron time 33r) in the Mahanadi Basin and the process continued southwards, ending at ~55 Ma near the Afanasy Nikitin Seamount. There are several proposals to explain the origin and development of the ridge, one of which is that the volcanism was caused by a short-lived hotspot.
