= Mauritia (microcontinent) =

Precambrian microcontinent that broke off India and Madagascar

Coordinates: 12°10′49.11″S 61°10′1.64″E

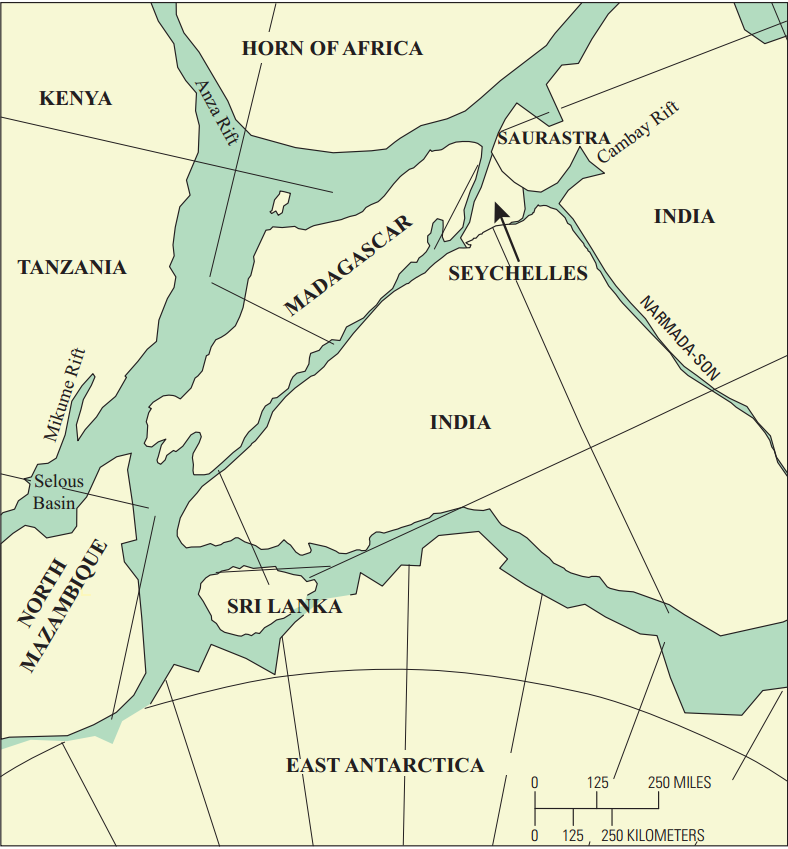
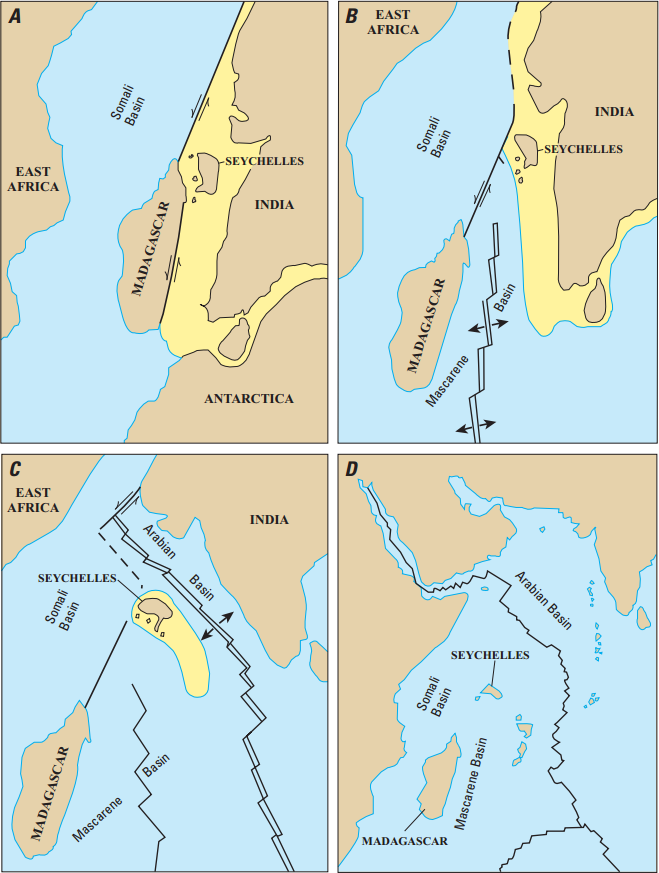
Early Jurassic breakup of Gondwana (left/above) and A. Early Cretaceous, B. Late Cretaceous, C. Paleocene, D. present day (right/below)

Mauritia was a Precambrian microcontinent that was situated between India and Madagascar until their separation about 70 million years ago. Being initially attached to the Indian continent, Mauritia separated from it about 60 million years ago and further fragmented into a ribbon-like structure as the mid-ocean ridge jumped several times. The jumps of the mid-ocean ridge are thought to have been caused of its interaction with the Réunion hotspot as it passed under the West margin of the Indian continent and then under Mauritia. As of today, the fragments of Mauritia include the Laccadives–Maldives–Chagos Ridge, Nazareth Bank, the Saya de Malha Bank, and Hawkins Bank, as well as the islands of Réunion and Mauritius, where the continual crust is buried under basaltic lavas of the Réunion hotspot.

Evidence for Mauritia's existence consists of detrital zircon found in rock (6-million-year-old trachyte) on Mauritius. Analyses of the zircon crystals produced dates between 660 and 1,970 million years and are considerably older than the 8.9-million-year-old basalt that constitutes the oldest formations on the island. The zircons are interpreted to have been brought up from buried continental crust as fragments entrained as xenocrysts within the basalt. Interpretation of a linear northwest–southeast gravity anomaly indicates the microcontinent may extend 1,500 kilometres (930 mi) from Seychelles to Mauritius roughly parallel to the Indian Ocean oceanic ridge.

== See also ==
- Mascarene Plateau – Submarine plateau in the western Indian Ocean
- Seychelles Microcontinent – Microcontinent in the Indian Ocean
- St Brandon – Mauritian atoll in the Indian Ocean
