= Geology of Réunion =

Réunion is a mafic island formed as a result of the Réunion hotspot in the Indian Ocean, the same hotspot that produced the massive basalt flows of the Deccan Traps, when it was beneath India more than 66 million years ago.

== Stratigraphy and tectonics ==
The island of Réunion formed from two volcanoes, the active Piton de la Fournaise on the southern end of the island and Piton des Neiges, which is slightly taller and dormant. The Reunion hotspot that formed the Deccan Traps also produced the Chagos-Laccadive Ridge and the Mascarene Plateau and plays a role in the geology of Mauritius and Rodriguez Island. Isotopic dating in 1969 found that Réunion, Mauritius and Rodriguez all developed independently, but Réunion and Mauritius were much more closely related to the formation of the Mascarene Plateau.

=== Piton des Neiges ===
Piton des Neiges is heavily eroded at the summit, nearly erasing its original crater, although it is surrounded by several smaller craters. Almost entirely basalt, the mountain also has small units of andesite, phonolite and trachyte with small alkaline syenite intrusions, forming dikes and sills.

In 1981, geologists suggested that volcanism at Piton des Neiges may be closely linked to regional structural geology. The main point of eruptive activity is associated with rift zone strike-slip faults and dike swarms around the mountain indicate cauldron subsidence. Structural characteristics help to explain the dramatic erosion of the central caldera, which collapsed due to graben formation. In addition, the eruption of younger lava flows may have emptied the magma chamber, helping to drive the collapse.

There are very few sedimentary rocks on Réunion except for an uplifted block of calcareous rock at the base of Piton des Neiges.

=== Piton de la Fournaise ===
Piton de la Fournaise has two semi-circular craters, surrounding older craters. The volcano experiences a mix of Hawaiian eruption and Strombolitian eruption types and typically has highly liquid lava flows. When cooled, Piton de la Fournaise lavas form basalt enriched in labradorite with almost no olivine. Historic evidence indicates that the volcano erupts on a 20 to 40-year cycle.

== Natural resource geology ==
Although there are few economically valuable deposits on the island, small quarries supply the local building supply industry.
