= Geology of Seychelles =

Map of the Seychelles

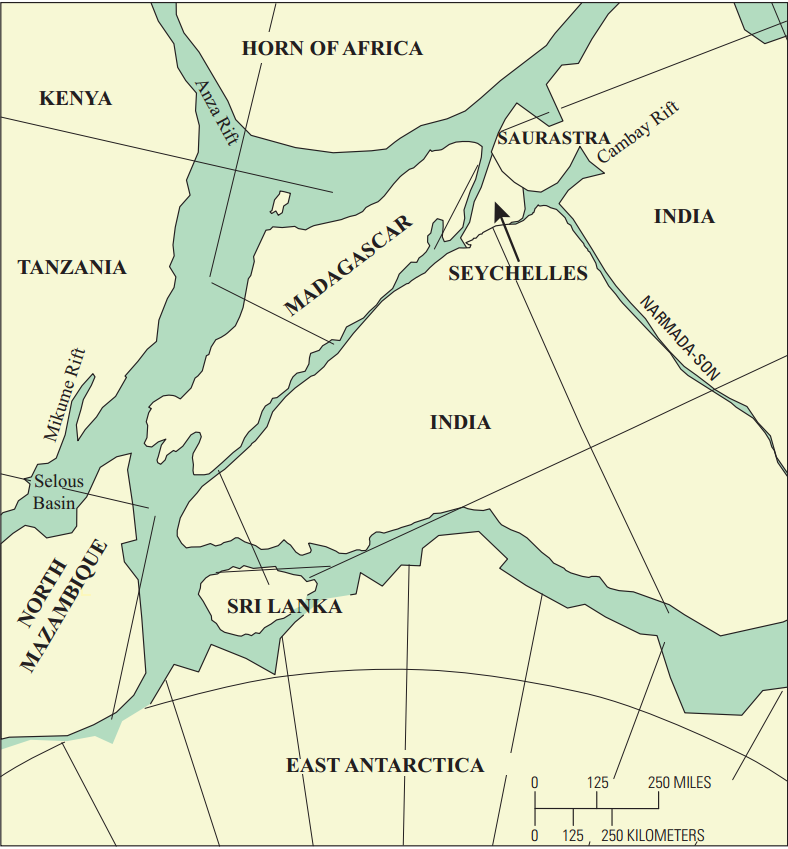
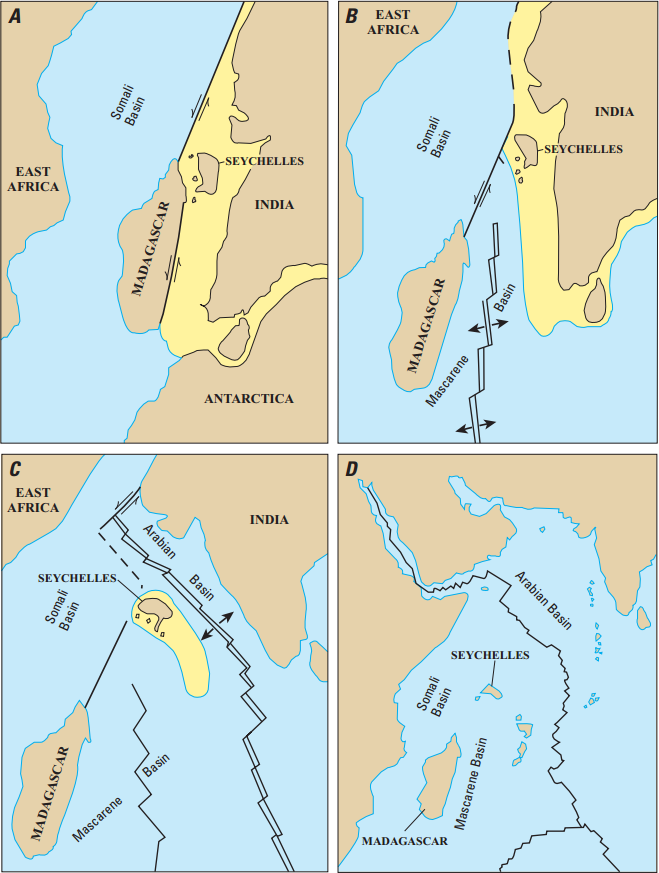
Early Jurassic breakup of Gondwana (left) and A- Early Cretaceous, B- Late Cretaceous, C-Paleocene, D- Present Day (right)

The geology of Seychelles is an example of a felsic granite microcontinent that broke off from the supercontinent Gondwana within the past 145 million years and become isolated in the Indian Ocean. The islands are primarily granite rock, with some sequences of sedimentary rocks formed during rift basin periods or times when the islands were submerged in shallow water.

== Stratigraphy and tectonics ==
Charles Darwin first published an account of the geology of the archipelago, while Alfred Wegener cited the area as evidence of continental drift.

Seychelles began to form in the Neoproterozoic as a granite microcontinent. Granite is the bedrock of Mahe, Praslin, La Digue and Fregate, with the rock dated as 748-755 Ma. Much of the rock is gray granite, while in southwest it is a pink porphyry form of granite.

The granites were cut by doleritic dykes, trending WNW-ESE, in the Precambrian and early Tertiary.

=== Paleozoic-Mesozoic ===
The rifting apart of the supercontinent Gondwana in the Late Paleozoic created failed rift grabens. The rifting process stalled and then continued in the Triassic until the Middle Jurassic as between two and six kilometers of clastic sediments accumulated on the western margin of the Seychelles microcontinent. Along the passive northwest margin with Gondwana, the coastline was submerged and one kilometer of fine sediments deposited there as the Somali oceanic basin formed.

East Gondwana fragmented 120 million years ago, splitting up Antarctica-Australia and Madagascar-Seychelles-India, which ultimately separated 85 million years ago as the Mascarene basin formed. The Deccan Traps hotspot, which poured out immense basalt flows in India 65 million years ago and ultimately formed islands such as Mauritius and Réunion, isolated Seychelles.

=== Mesozoic-Cenozoic ===
The microcontinent was confined between northern Madagascar and western India until the Late Cretaceous and evolved during the Cenozoic through a process of rift and drift tectonics. The microcontinent was uplifted, eroded and impacted by volcanic eruptions.

In the early Cenozoic, around 61-67 Ma, alkaline igneous rocks emplaced to become the Silhouette and Île du Nord islands.

== Hydrogeology ==
Seychelles sources most of its water from rainfall and desalination and receives 2300 millimeters of precipitation every year. Surface water is stored by the La Gogue dam and the Rochon dam. However, the government has had to institute water rationing during the dry season from May to October. Beginning in 2009, the Seychelles government took interest in groundwater as a backup supply in fractured granite bedrock, looking to the example of granite aquifers in Sweden and commercial water companies such as Gondwana Water Drilling Company, which drilled eight test wells in the 1990s.

== Natural resource geology ==
Seychelles had a small scale guano mining industry until the 1980s and has ongoing exploration for offshore oil and gas. Currently, there is no mining in Seychelles except quarrying for clay, coral and sand to use as building material.

== See also ==
- Arabian Basin
- Central Indian Ridge
