= Seychelles microcontinent =

Microcontinent in the Indian Ocean

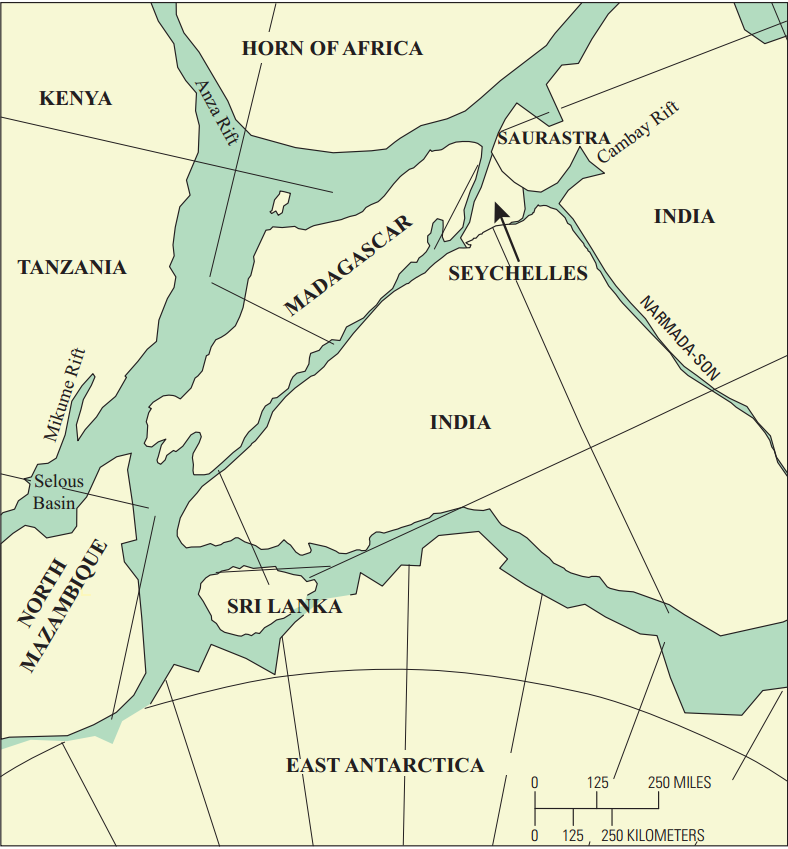
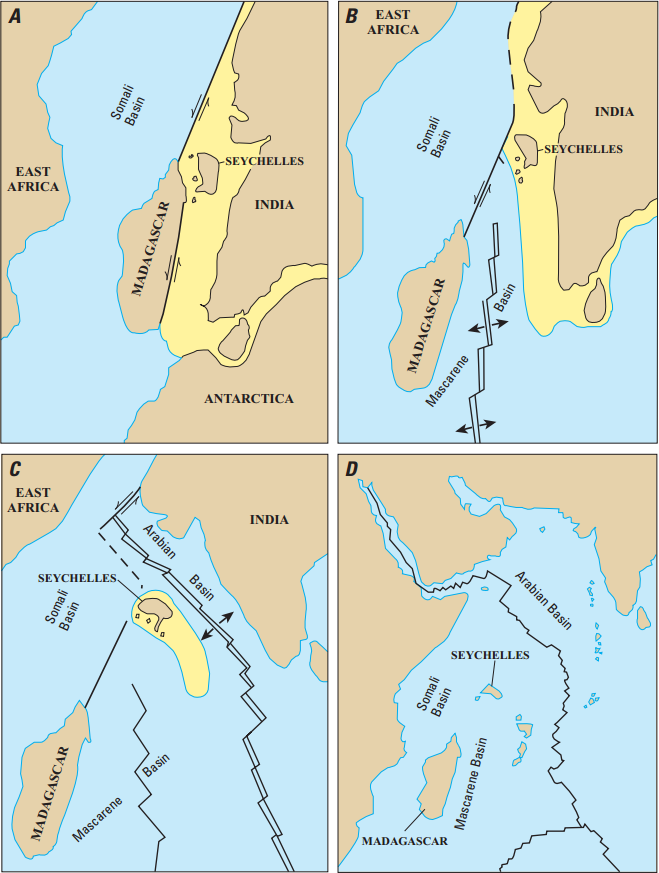
Early Jurassic breakup of Gondwana (left) and A- Early Cretaceous, B- Late Cretaceous, C-Paleocene, D- Present Day (right)

The Seychelles microcontinent underlies the Seychelles in the western Indian Ocean made of Late Precambrian rock.

The granite outcrops of the Seychelles Islands in the central Indian Ocean were amongst the earliest examples cited by Alfred Wegener as evidence for his continental drift theory. Ridge–plume interactions have been responsible for separating a thinned continental sliver from a large continent (i.e. India).

The granites of the Seychelles Microcontinent were emplaced 750 Ma, during the late Precambrian. Thermally-induced rifting in the Somali Basin and transform rifting along the Davie Fracture Zone began in the late Permian, 225 million years ago. The Gondwana supercontinent began to break up in the Middle Jurassic, about 167 million years ago. At that time, East Gondwana, comprising Antarctica, Madagascar, India, and Australia, began to separate from Africa. East Gondwana then began to separate about 115–120 million years ago when India began to move northward.

The Seychelles Islands then underwent two more stages of rifting to isolate it from Madagascar and India. Between 84 and 95 million years ago, rifting separated Seychelles/India from Madagascar. An initial period of transform rifting moved the Seychelles/India block northward. Around 84 million years ago, oceanic crust started to form in the Mascarene Basin, causing a rotation of the Seychelles/India land mass. This continued until 66 million years ago when new rifting severed the Seychelles from India, forming the currently active Carlsberg Ridge. The rift jump coincided with the maximum output of the Deccan Traps, and volcanics found on the Seychelles Plateau have also been linked with this event. This has led to suggestions that the initiation of the Reunion plume caused rifting to jump to its current location.

== See also ==
- Geography of Seychelles
- Geology of Seychelles
- Granitic Seychelles
- Mascarene Plateau – Submarine plateau in the western Indian Ocean
- Mauritia – A Precambrian microcontinent that broke away as India and Madagascar separated
