= Outer Islands of Mauritius =

Coordinates: 20.2°S 57.5°E

The Outer Islands of Mauritius is the first-level administrative divisions of Mauritius and consists of several outlying islands. The Outer Islands of Mauritius are managed under the aegis of the Prime Minister of Mauritius through the Prime Minister's Office by the Outer Islands Development Corporation which is the authority empowered under the law to manage the Outer Islands of Mauritius. The Prime Minister is also Minister for Rodrigues, Outer Islands and Territorial Integrity. The Constitution of Mauritius states that the Republic of Mauritius includes the islands of Agaléga, Mauritius, Rodrigues, Saint Brandon (Cargados Carajos shoals), Tromelin Island, and the Chagos Archipelago (including Diego Garcia and other associated islands). The Chagos Archipelago are set to be returned to Mauritius, after a long dispute with the United Kingdom. Additionally, France shares a sovereignty claim over Tromelin Island, an uninhabited island between Madagascar and Mauritius's main island.

== Territory ==
Republic of Mauritius, including islands claimed by the country

The total area of the Republic of Mauritius is 2,040 km^{2} (excluding the Chagos Archipelago), making it the 169th largest country in the world by area. Mauritian territory also incorporates the island of Rodrigues, which is situated some 560 kilometers to the east and is 104 km^{2} in area. Rodrigues used to be the country's tenth district, before it gained autonomous status in 2002. The two islands of Agaléga have a total land area of 2,600 hectares and are situated some 1,000 km to the north of Mauritius. Saint Brandon (Cargados Carajos) is situated some 430 km to the north-east of Mauritius; it is an archipelago comprising a number of sand banks, shoals, and islets. Just off the Mauritian coast lie some 49 tiny uninhabited islands and islets (see: Islets of Mauritius), some of which are used as natural reserves for the protection of endangered species.

The country's exclusive economic zone (EEZ) covers about 2.3 million km^{2} of the Indian Ocean, including approximately 400,000 km^{2} jointly managed with Seychelles. Four fishing banks fall within its EEZ limits: Hawkins Bank, Nazareth Bank, the Saya de Malha Bank, and the Soudan Banks (including East Soudan Bank). In 2011, the United Nations endorsed the joint submission of Mauritius and Seychelles to extend their continental shelf of 396,000 km^{2} in the Mascarene region which gives the two countries sovereign right to jointly manage and exploit the seabed and subsoil of the joint area.

== See also ==
- Chagos Archipelago sovereignty dispute
- Districts of Mauritius
- Geography of Mauritius
- ISO 3166-2:MU
- List of places in Mauritius
- Saint Brandon
