= Aden–Owen–Carlsberg triple junction =

Junction of three tectonic plates in the northwest Indian Ocean

- Arabia–India–Somalia triple junction
- Etymology: Aden Ridge; Owen fracture zone; Carlsberg Ridge
- Location: Gulf of Aden

Tectonics
- Plate: Arabian plate; Indian plate; Somali plate
- Type: Triple ridge triple junction
- Location near the Arabian Peninsula

The Aden–Owen–Carlsberg triple junction (AOC), also known as the Arabia–India–Somalia triple junction, is a triple junction that connects the Aden Ridge, Owen fracture zone, and Carlsberg Ridge in the northwest Indian Ocean. It has been described as one of only three RRF (ridge–ridge–fault) triple junctions on Earth, besides the Azores triple junction and Chile triple junction. However, because the fault arm of such unstable triple junctions tend to evolve into a spreading centre, all three cases have quickly evolved into stable RRR triple junctions.

Since a reorganisation of the involved tectonic plates c. 10 Ma, the AOC moves in discrete steps westward along the Aden Ridge. West of the southern termination of the Owen fracture zone, the Beautemps-Beaupré Basin, a new plate boundary develops and the basin will be transferred from the Arabian plate to the Indian plate in a near future.

The Carlsberg Ridge was opened between the Seychelles and India in the early Tertiary and has since undergone three stages of spreading. A first, fast stage 61 to 51 Ma with a 6 cm/year (2.4 in/year) half-rate spreading; a second 39 to 23 Ma ultra-slow (0.6 cm/year (0.24 in/year)) stage during the India-Eurasia collision; followed by the present slow (1.2 cm/year (0.47 in/year)) spreading which reaches 2.2 ± 0.1 cm/year (0.866 ± 0.039 in/year) in its northern end. This latest stage was initiated by the opening of the Gulf of Aden during which the Aden Ridge began to quickly propagate westward at a rate of 200 km (120 mi)/Ma.

The Owen fracture zone, together with the Dalrymple Trough in its northern end, is a transform fault along which spreading between the Arabian and Indian plates at the Carlsberg Ridge becomes the subduction of the Himalayan orogeny. The Owen fracture zone passes east of the Owen Ridge which was uplifted during the opening of the eastern Gulf of Aden in the Early Miocene. North of the Aden–Owen–Carlsberg triple junction, the Owen fracture zone is quiet for 250 km (160 mi) but right-lateral slip along its active segments indicates that Arabia is moving northward faster than India.

The relative motion between the Nubian and Somalian plates before 3.2 Ma is difficult to determine since the movement in the Southwest Indian Ridge is extremely slow. Analysing the Aden–Owen–Carlsberg triple junction, however, geologists have been able to determine that before 11 Ma the Nubia–Somalia relative motion was faster than today and contained a significant strike-slip component.
