= Arabian Basin =

Oceanic basin in the Arabian Sea

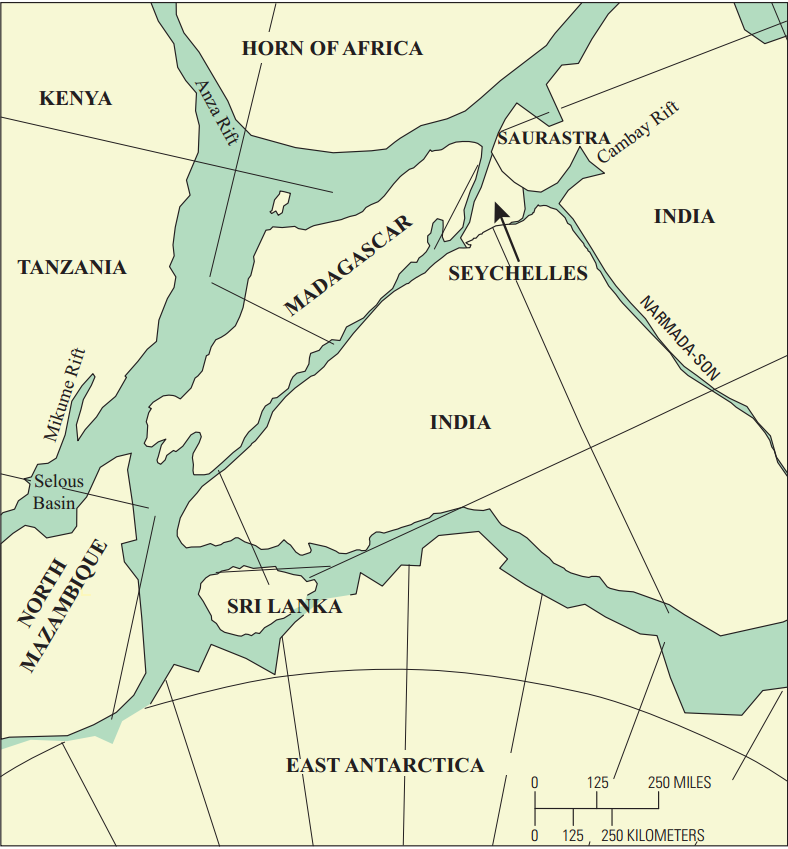
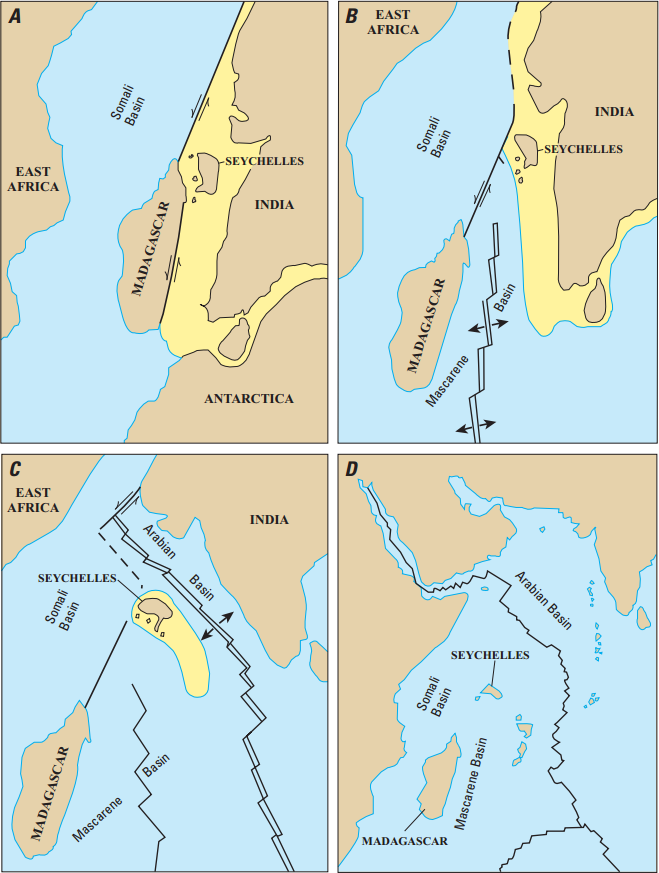
Early Jurassic breakup of Gondwana (left) and A- Early Cretaceous, B- Late Cretaceous, C-Paleocene, D- Present Day (right)

The Arabian Basin is an oceanic basin located in the southern part of the Arabian Sea between the Arabian Peninsula and India. It is centered at 10° N, 65° E. The basin depth ranges from 3,400 m in the north to 4,400 m in the south, with a maximum depth of 4,652 m. The floor is covered by sediments from the Indus submarine fan and is relatively smooth.

The southern enclosure of this basin is formed by the Central Indian Ridge, the Carlsberg Ridge and the Chagos-Laccadive Ridge. Bottom water enters the basin through the Owen fracture zone to the west. The Carlsberg Ridge, at a depth of 3,800 m, separates this basin from the Somali Basin to the southwest. The Arabian Basin is separated from the shallow Oman Basin by the Murray Ridge. Most of the northern and eastern limits are formed by the Laxmi Ridge and the Laccadive Plateau.
