= Amalda danilai =

Scientific classification
- Kingdom: Animalia
- Phylum: Mollusca
- Class: Gastropoda
- Subclass: Caenogastropoda
- Order: Neogastropoda
- Family: Ancillariidae
- Genus: Amalda
- Species: A. danilai

Binomial name
- Amalda danilai Kilburn, 1996

Species of gastropod

Amalda danilai is a species of sea snail, a marine gastropod mollusk in the family Ancillariidae.

== Distribution ==
First noted in 1996, at the Saya de Malha Bank, Western Indo-Pacific realm.
