= Bruceiella wareni =

Conservation status
- Critically Endangered (IUCN 3.1)

Scientific classification
- Kingdom: Animalia
- Phylum: Mollusca
- Class: Gastropoda
- Subclass: Vetigastropoda
- Order: Trochida
- Family: Skeneidae
- Genus: Bruceiella
- Species: B. wareni

Binomial name
- Bruceiella wareni Okutani, Hashimoto & Sasaki, 2004

Species of gastropod

Bruceiella wareni is a species of sea snail, a marine gastropod mollusk in the family Skeneidae.

The specific name wareni is in honor of Swedish malacologist Anders Warén.

== Discovery ==
The species was first described in 2004 by Japanese oceanographers (Okutani, Hashimoto, & Sasaki). It was named in honor of the renowned Swedish zoologist Anders Waren, who made significant contributions to the study of deep-sea mollusks.

== Distribution ==
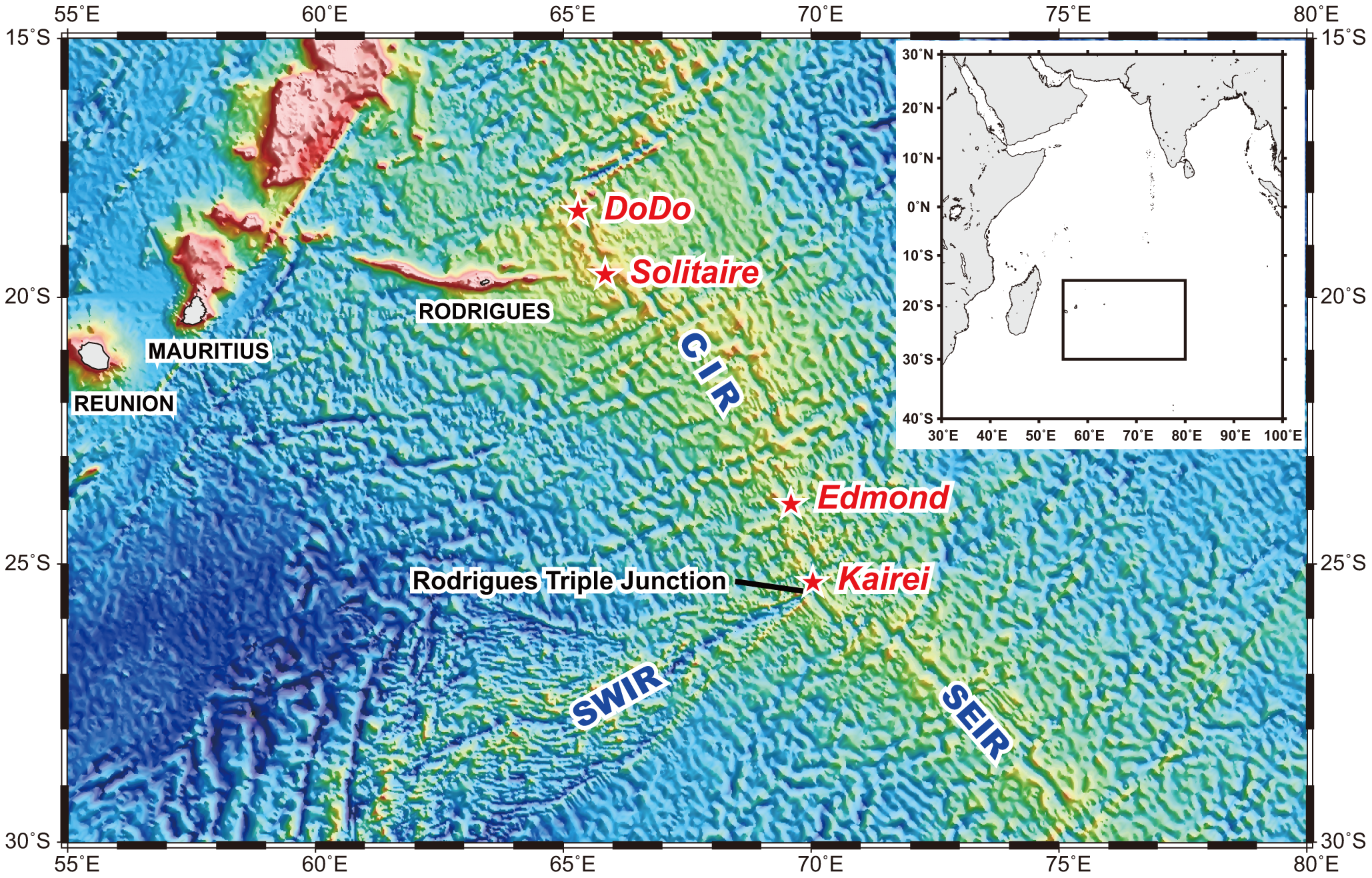
Map of southern part of the Central Indian Ridge (CIR) showing location of the Kairei hydrothermal vent site.

This species lives exclusively at great depths—approximately 2,400 meters below sea level. The type locality is the Kairei hydrothermal vent site on the Central Indian Ridge, just north of the Rodrigues Triple Point.

== Description ==
The width of the shell is 1.6-2.2 mm.
