= Geology of the Maldives =

The geology of the Maldives formed beginning 68 million years ago as a hotspot which produced the Deccan Traps in India. As India moved northward, the hotspot generated an island chain in the Indian Ocean, which includes Mauritius and Réunion. The Réunion hotspot trail was offset by the Central Indian Ridge 35 million years ago. The hotspot theory is supported by the fact that the basement basalts underlying the atolls of the Maldives are younger in the south, toward Réunion.
