= Indian plate =

Minor plate that separated from Gondwana

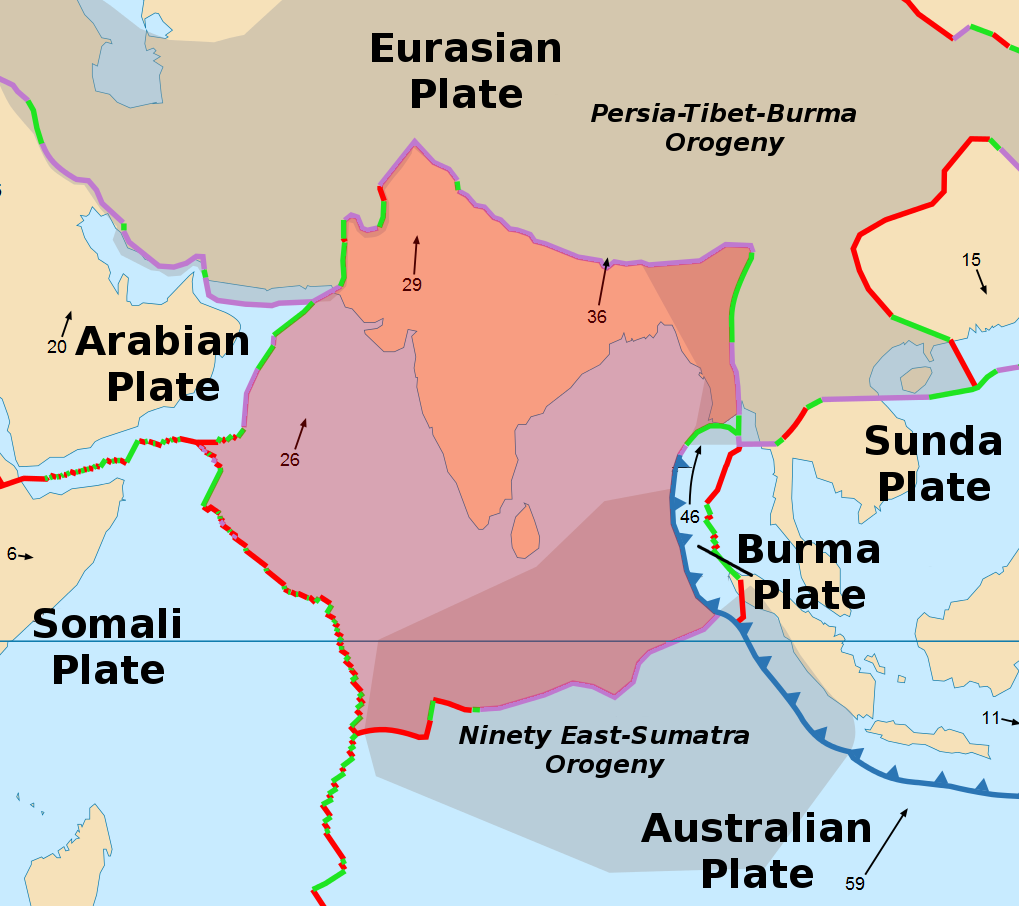
- Type: Minor
- Approximate area: 11,900,000 km^{2} (4,600,000 sq mi)
- Movement^{1}: North-east
- Speed^{1}: 26–36 mm/a (1.0–1.4 in/year)
- Features: Indian subcontinent, Indian Ocean, Arabian Sea, Himalayas
- ^{1}Relative to the African plate

The Indian plate is a minor tectonic plate straddling the equator in the Indian Ocean. Originally a part of the ancient continent of Gondwana, the Indian plate broke away from the other fragments of Gondwana 100 million years ago and began moving north, carrying Insular India with it. It was once fused with the adjacent Australian plate to form a single Indo-Australian plate, but recent studies suggest that India and Australia may have been separate plates for at least 3 million years. The Indian plate includes most of modern South Asia and a portion of the basin under the Indian Ocean, including parts of Tibet, Sumatra, and extending up to but not including Ladakh, Kohistan, and most of Balochistan in Pakistan.

== Plate movements ==
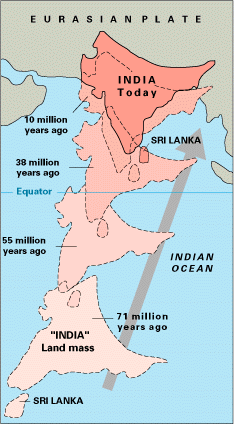
Due to plate tectonics, Insular India, situated over the Indian plate, split from Madagascar and collided (c. 55 Mya) with the Eurasian plate, resulting in the formation of the Himalayas.

Until roughly 140 million years ago, the Indian plate formed part of the supercontinent, Gondwana, together with modern Africa, Australia, Antarctica, and South America. Gondwana fragmented as these continents drifted apart at different velocities; a process which led to the opening of the Indian Ocean.

In the late Cretaceous approximately 100 million years ago, and subsequent to the splitting from Gondwana of conjoined Madagascar and India, the Indian plate split from Madagascar and formed Insular India. It began moving north, at about 20 cm (7.9 in) per year, and is believed to have begun colliding with Asia as early as 55 million years ago, in the Eocene epoch of the Cenozoic. However, some authors suggest the collision between India and Eurasia occurred much later, around 35 million years ago. If the collision occurred between 55 and 50 Mya, the Indian plate would have covered a distance of 3,000 to 2,000 km (1,900–1,200 mi), moving more quickly than any other known plate. In 2012, paleomagnetic data from the Greater Himalaya was used to propose two collisions to reconcile the discrepancy between the amount of crustal shortening in the Himalaya (~1,300 km or 800 mi) and the amount of convergence between India and Asia (~3,600 km or 2,200 mi). These authors propose a continental fragment of northern Gondwana rifted from India, traveled northward, and initiated the "soft collision" between the Greater Himalaya and Asia at ~50 Mya. This was followed by the "hard collision" between India and Asia occurred at ~25 Mya. Subduction of the resulting ocean basin that formed between the Greater Himalayan fragment and India explains the apparent discrepancy between the crustal shortening estimates in the Himalaya and paleomagnetic data from India and Asia. However, the proposed ocean basin was not constrained by paleomagnetic data from the key time interval of ~120 Mya to ~60 Mya. New paleomagnetic results of this critical time interval from southern Tibet do not support this Greater Indian Ocean basin hypothesis and the associated dual collision model.

In 2007, German geologists suggested the reason the Indian plate moved so quickly is that it is only half as thick (100 km or 62 mi) as the other plates which formerly constituted Gondwana. The mantle plume that once broke up Gondwana might also have melted the lower part of the Indian subcontinent, which allowed it to move both more quickly and farther than the other parts. The remains of this plume today form the Marion hotspot (Prince Edward Islands), the Kerguelen hotspot, and the Réunion hotspots. As India moved north, it is possible the thickness of the Indian plate degenerated further as it passed over the hotspots and magmatic extrusions associated with the Deccan and Rajmahal Traps. The massive amounts of volcanic gases released during the passage of the Indian plate over the hotspots have been theorised to have played a role in the Cretaceous–Paleogene extinction event, generally held to be due to a large asteroid impact.

In 2020, however, geologists at the University of Oxford and the Alfred Wegener Institute found that new plate-motion models displayed increased movement speeds in all mid-ocean ridges during the late Cretaceous, a result irreconcilable to current theories of plate tectonics and a refutation of the plume-push hypothesis. Pérez-Díaz concludes that the accelerated movement of the Indian plate is an illusion wrought by large errors in geomagnetic reversal timing around the Cretaceous–Paleogene boundary, and that a recalibration of the time scale shows no such acceleration exists.

The collision with the Eurasian plate along the boundary between India and Nepal formed the orogenic belt that created the Tibetan Plateau and the Himalaya Mountains, as sediment bunched up like earth before a plow.

The Indian plate is currently moving north-east at five cm (2.0 in) per year, while the Eurasian plate is moving north at only two cm (0.79 in) per year. This is causing the Eurasian plate to deform, and the Indian plate to compress at a rate of four mm (0.16 in) per year.

== Geography ==
The westerly side of the Indian plate is a transform boundary with the Arabian plate called the Owen fracture zone, and a divergent boundary with the African plate called the Central Indian Ridge (CIR). The northerly side of the plate is a convergent boundary with the Eurasian plate forming the Himalaya and Hindu Kush mountains, called the Main Himalayan Thrust.

== See also ==
- Historical geology
- List of tectonic plate interactions
- List of tectonic plates
- Palaeogeography
- Seychelles microcontinent
