= Calliostoma grohi =

Scientific classification
- Kingdom: Animalia
- Phylum: Mollusca
- Class: Gastropoda
- Subclass: Vetigastropoda
- Order: Trochida
- Family: Calliostomatidae
- Genus: Calliostoma
- Species: C. grohi

Binomial name
- Calliostoma grohi Stratmann & Stahlschmidt, 2007

Species of gastropod

Calliostoma grohi is a species of sea snail, a marine gastropod mollusc in the family Calliostomatidae.

== Distribution ==
This marine species occurs off the Saya de Malha Bank, Western Indian Ocean.
