= Uraltau (continent) =

Palaeozoic microcontinent

Uraltau was a microcontinent that existed during the Palaeozoic era. It lay to the northeast of Baltica from the Devonian to the Permian, an epicontinental basin separating the two.
