= Geology of the British Indian Ocean Territory =

The geology of the British Indian Ocean Territory comprises the Chagos Archipelago — the above water portion of the Chagos Bank. Formed from hotspot volcanism, the Chagos Bank was separated from the Nazareth Bank, which is administered by Mauritius, 36 million years ago by activity on the Central Indian Ridge. Aside from plate boundaries, the region is one of the most seismically active and earthquakes have caused subsidence of some islands.

Described by Charles Darwin as "a ledge of brecciated coral rocks projecting seawards from the outer shore," the Chagos Archipelago has unusual conglomerate platforms. The islands lack Eemian age carbonates, which are present in the Seychelles Islands for reasons that are not clear—hypothesized to include local storm erosion.

The offshore waters around the archipelago contain deep-sea ferromanganese nodules, with globular, dendritic and laminated microstructures formed from iron-manganese oxide. Due to the US military presence on the island, the US Geological Survey has conducted water resource analysis since 1984.

The islands of the Chagos Archipelago are mainly low and flat, mainly not reaching two meters above sea level.
