= Amalda trippneri =

Scientific classification
- Kingdom: Animalia
- Phylum: Mollusca
- Class: Gastropoda
- Subclass: Caenogastropoda
- Order: Neogastropoda
- Family: Ancillariidae
- Genus: Amalda
- Species: A. trippneri

Binomial name
- Amalda trippneri Kilburn, 1996

Species of gastropod

Amalda trippneri is a species of sea snail, a marine gastropod mollusk in the family Ancillariidae. It was named after Edmund Trippner at the request of Dr. Axel Alf.

== Distribution ==
It was found in the Saya de Malha Bank, between Mauritius and the Seychelles.
