= Geology of Mauritius =

The geology of Mauritius and Rodrigues is comparatively recent. The oldest rocks on Mauritius are only 10 million years old and 1.54 million years old on Rodrigues Island. The mafic basalts of the two islands formed in relation to the hotspot that generated the Deccan Traps and coral reefs built on the volcanoes forming non-volcanic sediments.

== Stratigraphy, tectonics and geologic history ==
Mauritius is closely related to the geology of Réunion. Both formed as a result of the hotspot, now slowly tracking beneath the Indian Ocean, which formed the massive basalt flows of the Deccan Traps, when it was beneath India in the Late Cretaceous. The Emergence Period in Mauritius began in the Neogene, 10 million years ago with the Breccia Series and continued with the Old Series, until five million years ago. The Old Series includes olivine basalt, agglomerate, trachyte intrusions and trachyandesite plugs.

The Early Volcanic, also known as the Intermediate Series continued from 3.5 to 1.7 million years ago, into the Quaternary. The youngest olivine flood basalts emplaced between 700,000 and 20,000 years ago. Rodrigues Island is slightly younger than Mauritius. Radiometric dating gives an age of 1.54 million years ago. The volcano on Rodrigues built the island up to an elevation of 450 meters above sea level, with 62 meters of coral debris covering its southwestern plain.

== Hydrogeology ==
Most of the aquifers in Mauritius are in fractured volcanic rocks, overlying the more impermeable volcanics from the island's formation. The central plateau has high permeability in intermediate volcanics and also receives the highest rainfall. The five main aquifers are the Curepipe-Vacoas-Flic en Flac, Phoenix-Beau Bassin-Moka-Coromandel, Nouvelle France-Rose Belle-Plaisance, Nouvelle Decouverte-Plaine des roches-Midlands-Trou D'eau Douce and Northern Plains.

== Natural resource geology ==
Mining is not a major part of the economy of Mauritius. In the past, the island had had basalt and coral sand quarrying for building material. Texaco explored offshore for oil in the 1970s. Offshore, there is a 400 to 800 kilometer belt of polymettalic nodules on the sea floor, four kilometers deep. Sand quarrying was banned in 1991, although some sand mining continues in the lagoon.
