= Bruceiella pruinosa =

Scientific classification
- Kingdom: Animalia
- Phylum: Mollusca
- Class: Gastropoda
- Subclass: Vetigastropoda
- Order: Trochida
- Family: Skeneidae
- Genus: Bruceiella
- Species: B. pruinosa

Binomial name
- Bruceiella pruinosa B. A. Marshall, 1994

Species of gastropod

Bruceiella pruinosa is a species of sea snail, a marine gastropod mollusk in the family Skeneidae.

== Description ==
The length of the shell attains 1.7 mm, its diameter is 1.4 mm.

== Distribution ==
This marine species was found off North Island, New Zealand, at a depth of 900 m.
