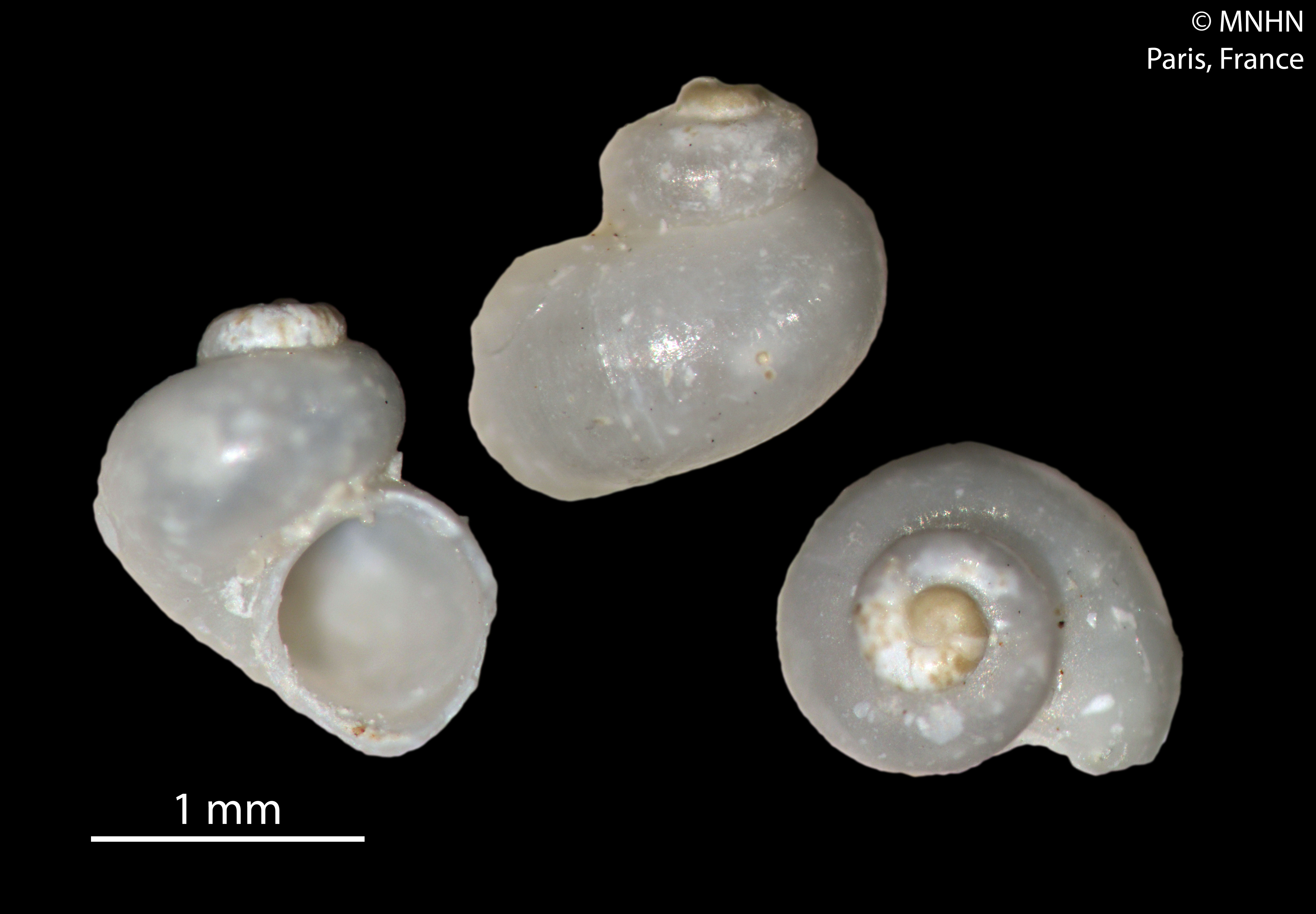
- Shell of Bruceiella laevigata

Scientific classification
- Kingdom: Animalia
- Phylum: Mollusca
- Class: Gastropoda
- Subclass: Vetigastropoda
- Order: Trochida
- Superfamily: Trochoidea
- Family: Skeneidae
- Genus: Bruceiella; Warén & Bouchet, 1993

Type species
- Bruceiella globulus Warén & Bouchet, 1993

= Bruceiella =

Genus of gastropods

Bruceiella is a genus of sea snails, marine gastropod mollusks in the family Skeneidae.

== Species ==
Species within the genus Bruceiella include:

- Bruceiella athlia Warén & Bouchet, 2001
- Bruceiella globulus Warén & Bouchet, 1993
- Bruceiella indurata C. Chen & Linse, 2019
- Bruceiella laevigata B. A. Marshall, 1994
- Bruceiella pruinosa B. A. Marshall, 1994
- Bruceiella wareni Okutani, Hashimoto & Sasaki, 2004
