= Bruceiella athlia =

Scientific classification
- Kingdom: Animalia
- Phylum: Mollusca
- Class: Gastropoda
- Subclass: Vetigastropoda
- Order: Trochida
- Family: Skeneidae
- Genus: Bruceiella
- Species: B. athlia

Binomial name
- Bruceiella athlia Warén & Bouchet, 1993

Species of gastropod

Bruceiella athlia is a species of sea snail, a marine gastropod mollusk in the family Skeneidae.
