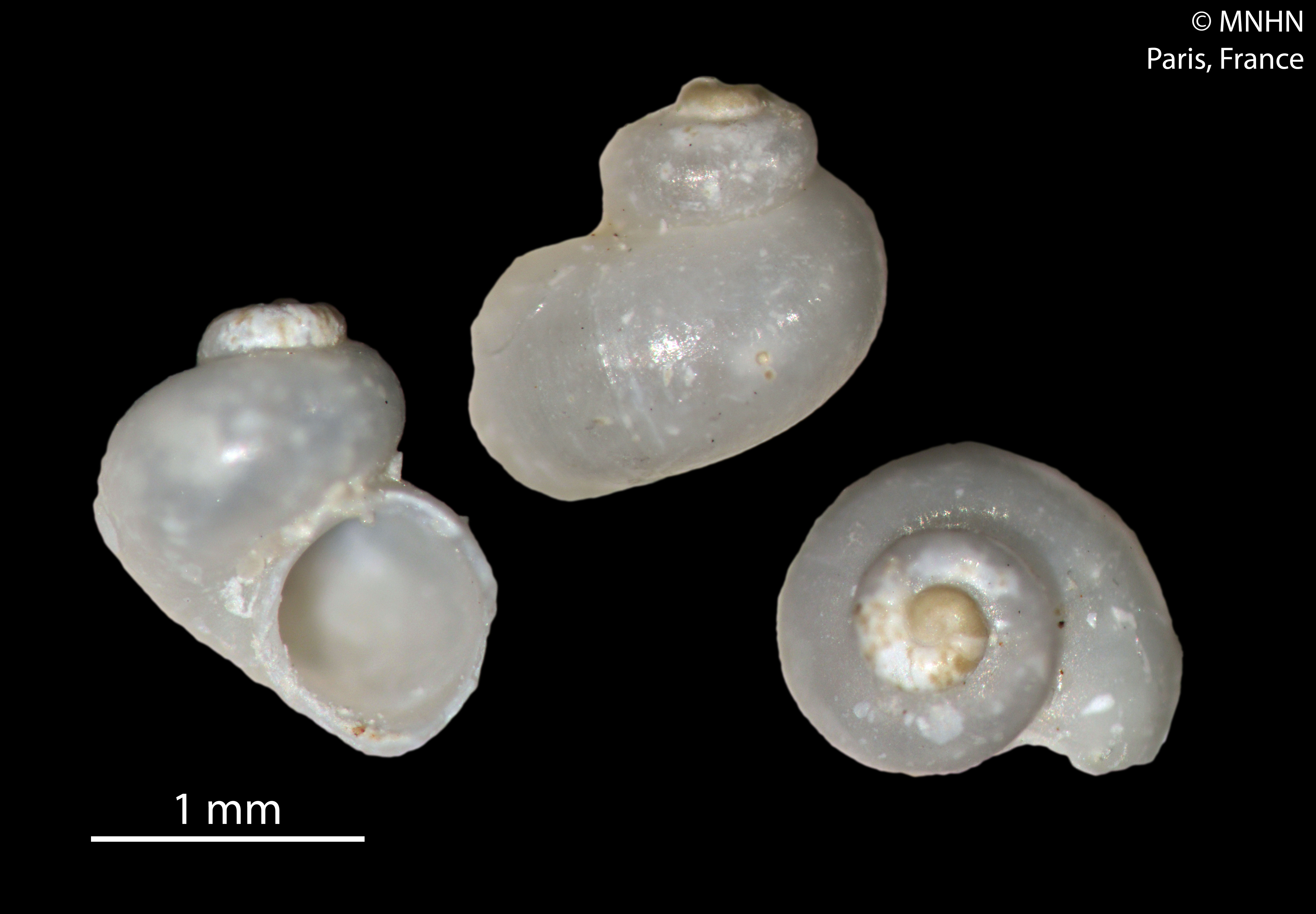
- Shell of Bruceiella laevigata (paratype at MNHN, Paris)

Scientific classification
- Kingdom: Animalia
- Phylum: Mollusca
- Class: Gastropoda
- Subclass: Vetigastropoda
- Order: Trochida
- Family: Skeneidae
- Genus: Bruceiella
- Species: B. laevigata

Binomial name
- Bruceiella laevigata B. A. Marshall, 1994

= Bruceiella laevigata =

Species of gastropod

Bruceiella laevigata is a species of sea snail, a marine gastropod mollusk in the family Skeneidae.

== Description ==
The height of the shell attains 1.7 mm, its diameter is 1.5 mm.

== Distribution ==
This marine species was found off the Chatham Islands, New Zealand, at a depth of 1,242 metres.
