= Davis Strait proto-microcontinent =

Failed microcontinent between Canada and Greenland

The Davis Strait proto-microcontinent is a failed microcontinent located in the Davis Strait between Canada and Greenland discovered in 2024.

It is roughly 19 to 24 kilometres (12 to 15 mi) thick surrounded by a thinned out continental crust which is 14 to 17 kilometres (8.7 to 10.6 mi) thick on each side. It is considered a proto-microcontinent because it is incompletely rifted and submerged. The separation of the Davis Strait proto-microcontinent coincides with a change in the orientation of tectonic spreading, which occurred between 58 and 49 million years ago.
