= Continental fragment =

Part of a continent broken from its main mass

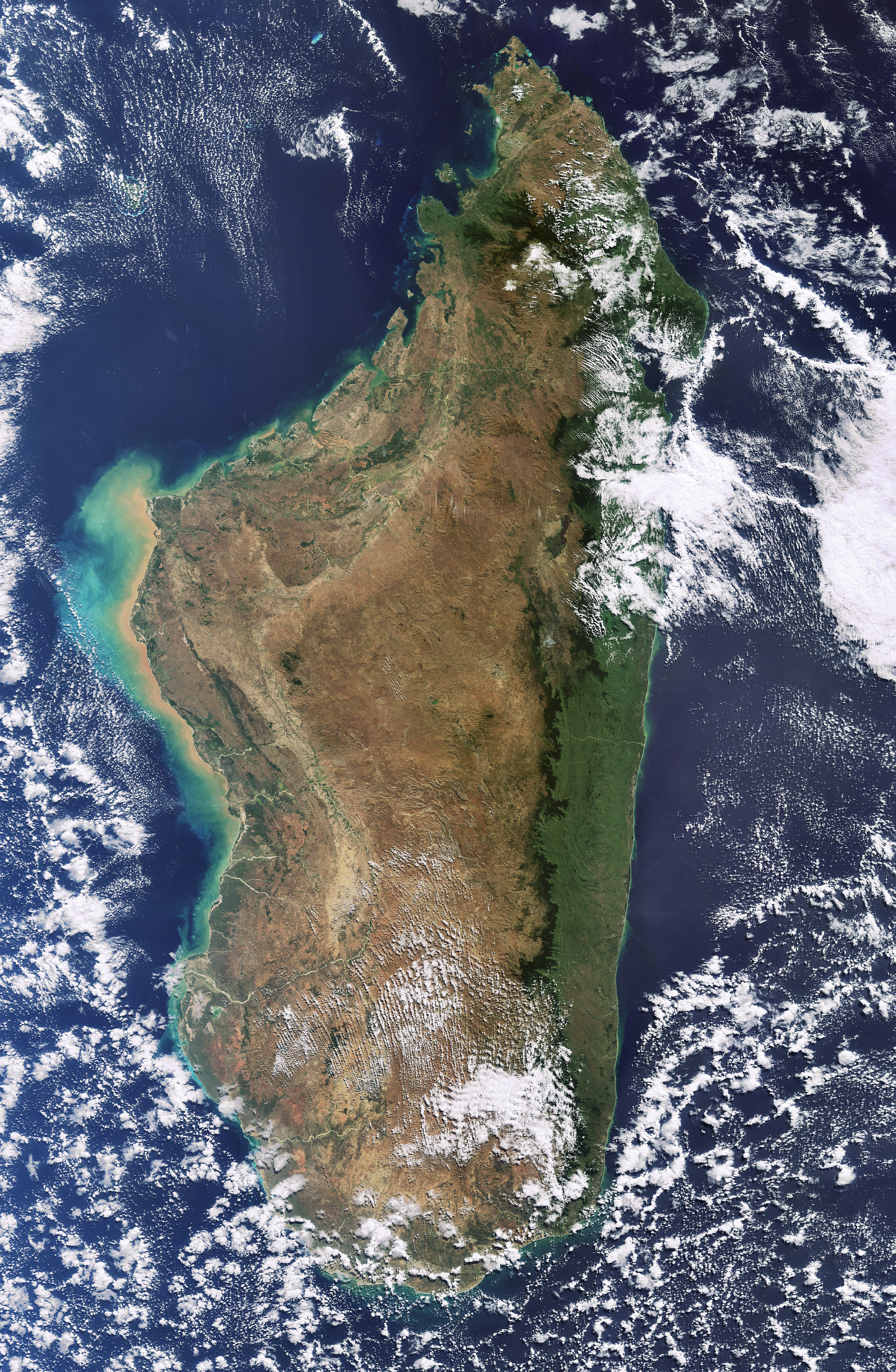
Madagascar, a continental fragment.

Continental crustal fragments, partly synonymous with microcontinents, are pieces of continents that have broken off from main continental masses to form distinct islands that are often several hundred kilometers from their place of origin.

== Causes ==
Continental fragments and microcontinent crustal compositions are very similar to those of regular continental crust. The rifting process that caused the continental fragments to form most likely impacts their layers and overall thickness along with the addition of mafic intrusions to the crust. Studies have determined that the average crustal thickness of continental fragments is approximately 24.8 ± 5.7 kilometres (15.4 ± 3.5 mi). The sedimentary layer of continental fragments can be up to 5 kilometres (3.1 mi) thick and can overlay two to three crustal layers. Continental fragments have an average crustal density of 2.81 g/cm^{3} (0.102 lb/cu in) which is very similar to that of typical continental crust.

Strike-slip fault zones cause the fragmentation of microcontinents. The zones link the extensional zones where continental pieces are already isolated through the remaining continental bridges. Additionally, they facilitate quick crustal thinning across narrow zones and near-vertical strike-slip-dominated faults. They develop fault-block patterns that slice the portion of continent into detachable slivers. The continental fragments are located at various angles from their transform faults.

== History ==
Some microcontinents are fragments of Gondwana or other ancient cratonic continents; examples include Madagascar; the northern Mascarene Plateau, which includes the Seychelles Microcontinent; and the island of Timor. Other islands, such as several in the Caribbean Sea, are composed largely of granitic rock as well, but all continents contain both granitic and basaltic crust, and there is no clear dividing line between islands and microcontinents under such a definition. The Kerguelen Plateau is a large igneous province formed by a volcanic hotspot; however, it was associated with the breakup of Gondwana and was for a time above water, so it is considered a microcontinent, though not a continental fragment. Other hotspot islands such as the Hawaiian Islands and Iceland are considered neither microcontinents nor continental fragments. Not all islands can be considered microcontinents: Borneo, the British Isles, Newfoundland, and Sri Lanka, for example, are each within the continental shelf of an adjacent continent, separated from the mainland by inland seas flooding its margins.

Several islands in the eastern Indonesian Archipelago are considered continental fragments, although this designation is controversial. The archipelago is home to numerous microcontinents with complex geology and tectonics. This makes it complicated to classify landmasses and determine causation for the formation of the landmass. These include southern Bacan, Banggai-Sulu Islands (Sulawesi), the Buru-Seram-Ambon complex (Maluku), Obi, Sumba, and Timor (Nusa Tenggara).

== List of continental fragments and microcontinents ==
=== Continental fragments (pieces of Pangaea smaller than Australia) ===
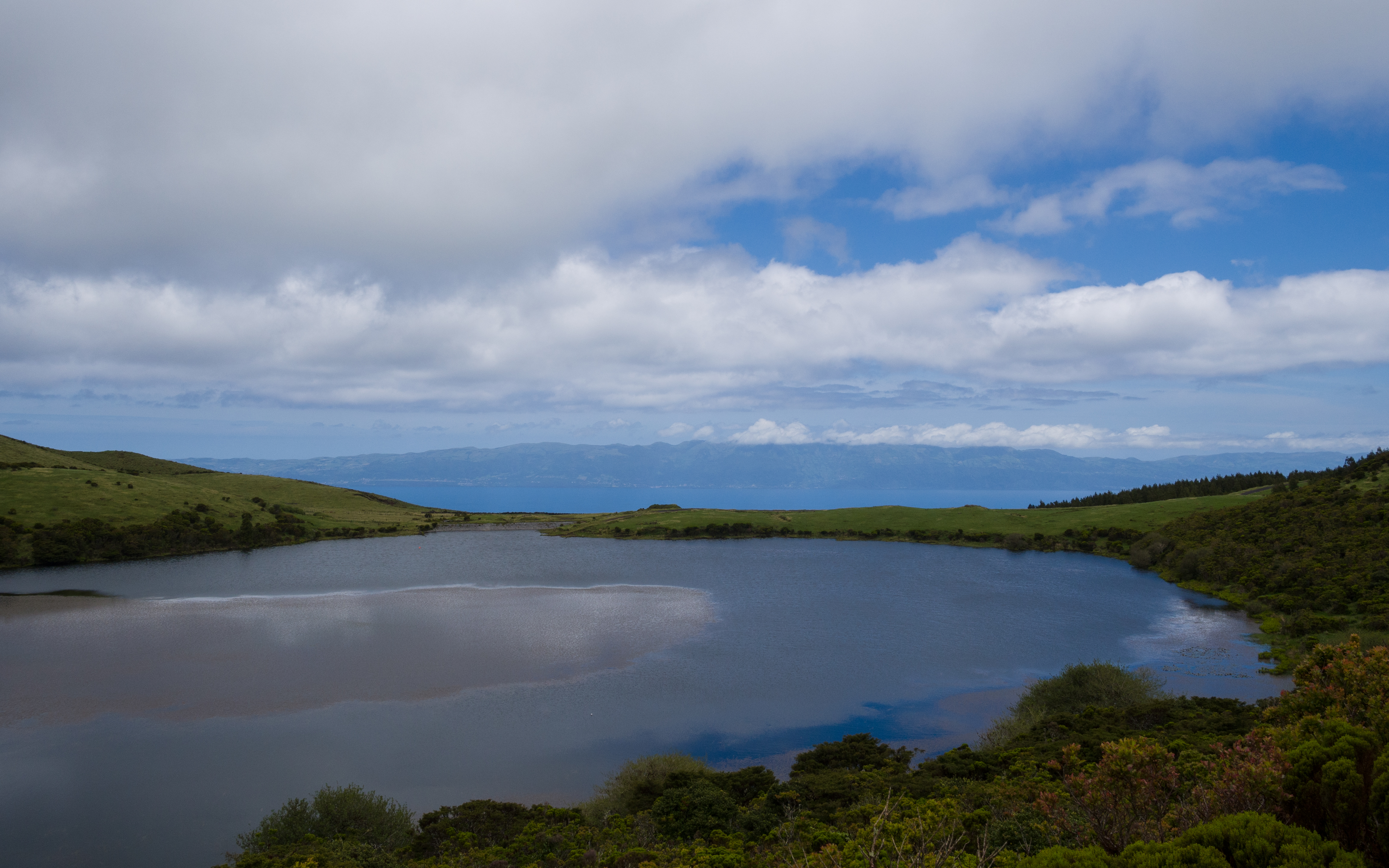
Azores Plateau, a continental fragment located in the North Atlantic Ocean

- Bollons Seamount – Continental fragment seamount southeast of New Zealand
- Broken Ridge – Oceanic plateau in the Indian Ocean
- East Tasman Plateau – Submerged microcontinent south east of Tasmania
- Joseph Gilbert Seamount – Continental fragment seamount west of New Zealand
- Jan Mayen Microcontinent – Atlantic fragment of continental crust
- Madagascar – African island country in the Indian Ocean
- Mascarene Plateau – Submarine plateau in the western Indian Ocean
  - Seychelles Microcontinent – Microcontinent in the Indian Ocean
- Mauritia – Precambrian microcontinent that broke off India and Madagascar
- Parts of Wallaby Plateau – Undersea bathymetric high west of Australia
- Possibly Sumba, Timor, and other islands of eastern Indonesia; Sulawesi formed via the subduction of a microcontinent
- Socotra – Largest of four islands of the Socotra Archipelago, Yemen
- South Orkney microcontinent
- Zealandia – Mostly submerged continental crust area in Oceania

=== Other microcontinents (formed post-Pangaea) ===
- Cuba, Hispaniola, Jamaica, and other granitic Caribbean islands
- Kerguelen Plateau – Oceanic plateau in the southern Indian Ocean

=== Future microcontinents ===
- Davis Strait proto-microcontinent, Currently in the process of forming between Greenland and Canada.

== See also ==
- Continental shelf
