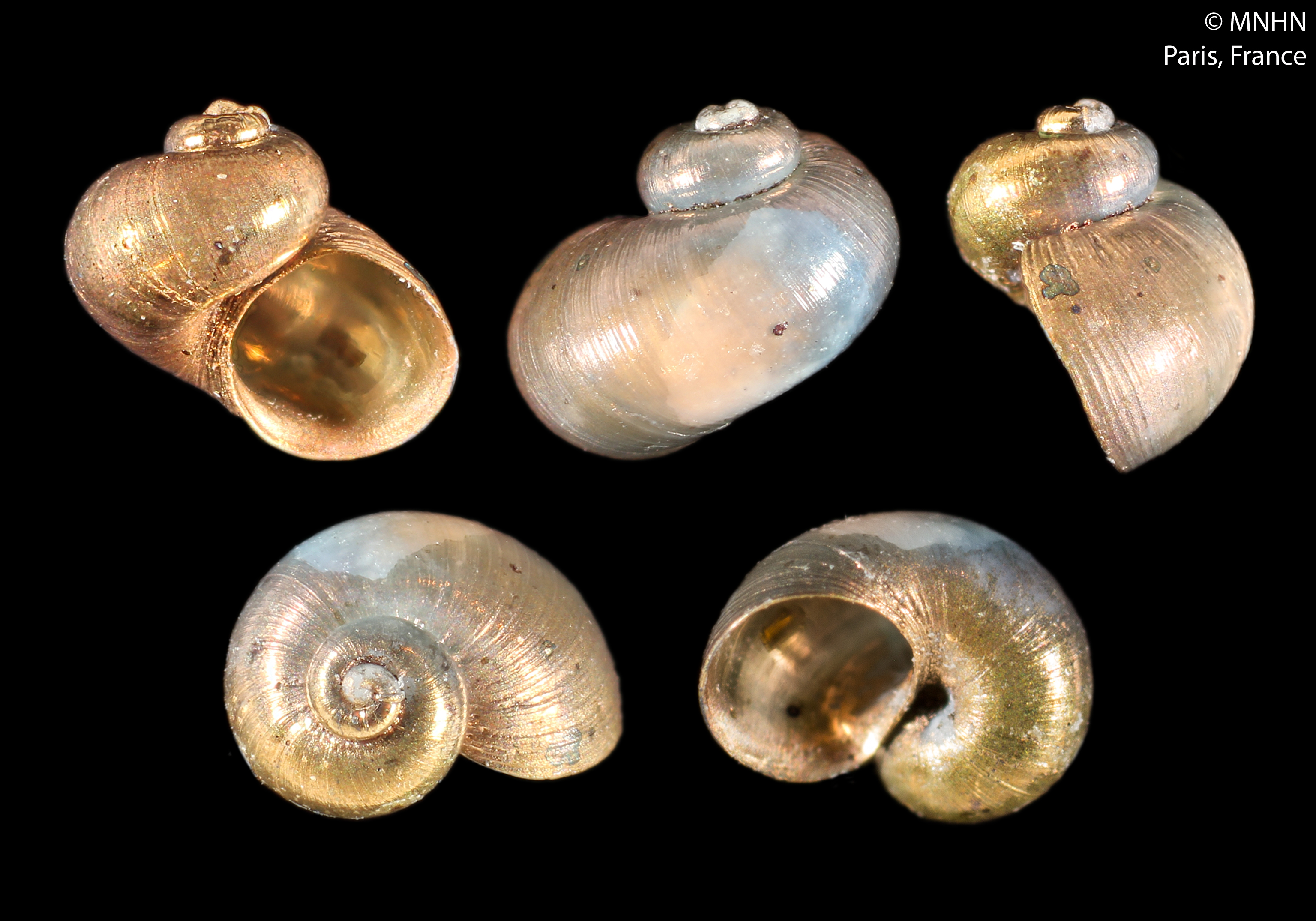
- Shell of Bruceiella globulus (holotype at MNHN, Paris)

Conservation status
- Vulnerable (IUCN 3.1)

Scientific classification
- Kingdom: Animalia
- Phylum: Mollusca
- Class: Gastropoda
- Subclass: Vetigastropoda
- Order: Trochida
- Family: Skeneidae
- Genus: Bruceiella
- Species: B. globulus

Binomial name
- Bruceiella globulus Warén & Bouchet, 1993

= Bruceiella globulus =

Species of gastropod

Bruceiella globulus is a species of sea snail, a marine gastropod mollusk in the family Skeneidae.

== Distribution ==
This marine species occurs off the Fiji Islands.
