= Owen fracture zone =

Transform fault in the northwest Indian Ocean

Owen fracture zone

The Owen fracture zone (OFZ), though misnamed as a fracture zone, is a transform fault in the northwest Indian Ocean that separates the Arabian and African plates from the Indian plate. Extending north-northeast from where the Carlsberg Ridge meets the Sheba ridge in the south to the Makran Subduction Zone in the north, it represents the port side of the northward motion of the Indian subcontinent during the Late Cretaceous–Palaeogene break-up of Gondwana. Slip along the Owen fracture zone is occurring at 2 mm (0.079 in)/yr, the slowest rate on Earth, which means the Arabian plate moves northward faster than the Indian plate (4 vs. 2 mm/yr).

In some usages, the name Owen Transform Fault is used to denote the short section between the end of the Aden-Sheba ridge and the Carlsberg Ridge. Additionally, this area has been called the Aden–Owen–Carlsberg triple junction, although the Carlsberg Ridge is offset 330 km (210 mi) from the point where the Owen fracture zone/fault intersects the Sheba segment of the Aden Ridge.

The Owen fracture zone is named after HMS Owen that identified the 'fracture line' in April/May 1963. The Owen fracture zone and the Dalrymple Trough north of it (named after HMS Dalrymple surveyed the area together with HMS Owen) form the modern boundary between the Arabian and Indian plates.

== Bathymetry and oceanography ==
800 km (500 mi)-long, the Owen fracture zone runs along the Owen Ridge which is divided into two. The Southern Owen Ridge, 300 km (190 mi) long and 50 km (31 mi)-wide, is a near-linear structure that drops steeply 2,000 m (6,600 ft) on its eastern side. The top layers of the Southern Ridge are formed by the Oligocene-Early Miocene turbidites of the Indus River Fan and later cover. The Central Owen ridge, 220 km (140 mi)-long and 50 km (31 mi)-wide, in contrast, is more uneven and reaches a maximum height of 1,700 m (5,600 ft). The Qalhat Seamount and Murray Ridge are located at the northern end of the Owen fracture zone.

The exchange of deep water from the Somali Basin to the Arabian Basin through the OFZ has been estimated to 2 Sv. In the Arabian Basin the current splits into a northern and southern branch that both flow parallel to the Carlsberg Ridge.

== Plate tectonics ==
Seafloor spreading in the Sheba ridge began c. 20 Ma. Subduction in the Makran Trench was initiated in the Late Cretaceous and the accretionary wedge there developed 7.2 to 11.6 Ma. Seismic lines from drillings in the 1970s and 1980s beneath both ridges revealed a structure now known as the 50 to 55 Ma-old Proto-Owen Ridge which was uplifted and rejuvenated during the Early Miocene. According to one reconstruction, before the initiation of the Carlsberg Ridge the Arabian–Indian boundary was located off Oman 90 to 60 Ma while the Mascarene Basin opened between Madagascar and the Seychelles. In the Early Miocene (c. 20 Ma) the boundary jumped to its present location which uplifted the Owen Ridge. 10–12 km (6.2–7.5 mi)-long offsets along the OFZ indicate a 3-6 Ma-old dextral strike-slip motion but this motion can be extended to 20 Ma based on magnetic anomaly reconstructions. This coincides with a general reorganisation of continental plates in the Indian Ocean in response to the Arabia-Eurasia collision.
