= Soudan Banks =

Coordinates: 18.5335°S 58.7166°E

The Soudan Banks are a series of underwater high points and reefs off the coast of Africa, known for their good fishing yields as fishing banks. They are administered by Mauritius. The five banks (actually a single feature) lie on the Mascarene plateau. North Soudan contains large salmon stocks. South Soudan is the largest of the banks, with many reefs and passes. West Soudan is small, rocky, and shallow, and is the least fished of the banks. Central Soudan is the most fished area, with huge reefs and open waters containing a huge abundance of fish. East Soudan, until the 1970s, was considered to be a completely different formation altogether, since it is located more than 100 miles away from the other banks. The other banks are closely linked, separated by small shallows or channels.

Two million years ago, Soudan was a large island, as were Nazareth, Cargados Carajos and Saya de Malha. These islands were more than ten times the size of Mauritius and Reunion. However, they have submerged under the ocean, apart from some small islands in the Cargados Carajos.

== See also ==
- Hawkins Bank
- Nazareth Bank
- Saya de Malha Bank
