= Hawkins Bank =

Submerged bank in the Indian Ocean

Hawkins Bank is a large submerged bank off the Mascarene Plateau. It is considered a dependency of Mauritius (in terms of fishing banks, much like the Saya de Malha Bank, Nazareth Bank, and the Soudan Banks). The bank is abundant with fish and Mauritian vessels often fish in the waters in and around the bank.

== See also ==
- Nazareth Bank
- Saya de Malha Bank
- Soudan Banks
