= Nazareth Bank =

- Submerged bank Nazareth Bank (Indian Ocean)

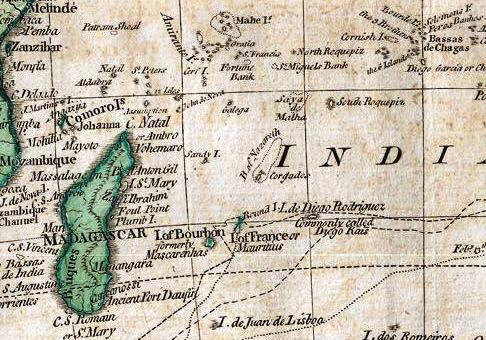
- Nazareth Bank and the Saya de Malha Bank on a 1794 Samuel Dunn map section
- Interactive map of Nazareth Bank
- Country: Mauritius

Area
  - Total: 7,625–26,000 km^{2} (2,944–10,039 sq mi)

Nazareth Bank is a large submerged bank in the Indian Ocean.

== Geography ==
It lies about 1,040 km east of northern Madagascar and 280 km south of the Saya de Malha Bank. The closest land is Cargados Carajos shoals, a small and remote dependency of Mauritius located 140 km to the southwest. The Nazareth Bank is part of the vast undersea Mascarene Plateau and of the Reunion hotspot track.

The center of the bank is at 14°30′0.0″S 60°40′0.0″E. Its extent is about 176 km north–south and up to 87 km east–west, with a surface of about 11,000 km^{2}. This undersea bank is administered by Mauritius.

== See also ==
- Hawkins Bank
- Saya de Malha Bank
- Soudan Banks
