= Mascarene Plateau =

Submarine plateau in the western Indian Ocean

Coordinates: 12°S 61°E

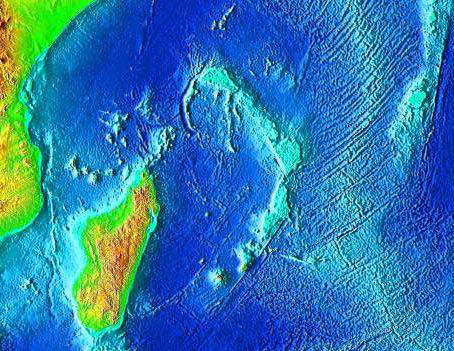
Topographical map of the Plateau

The Mascarene Plateau is a submarine plateau in the Indian Ocean, north and east of Madagascar. The plateau extends approximately 2,000 km (1,200 mi), from Seychelles in the north to Réunion in the south. The plateau covers an area of over 115,000 km^{2} (44,000 sq mi) of shallow water, with depths ranging from 8–150 m (30–490 ft), plunging to 4,000 m (13,000 ft) to the abyssal plain at its edges.

It is the second-largest oceanic plateau in the Indian Ocean after the Kerguelen Plateau.

== Geography ==
The northern part of the Mascarene Plateau includes the Agaléga Islands and the Seychelles Islands. The southern part of the Mascarene Plateau includes Hawkins Bank, the Mascarene Islands, Nazareth Bank, the Saya de Malha Bank, and the Soudan Banks. The Mascarene Islands are the mountainous islands of the Cargados Carajos Shoals, Mauritius, Réunion, and Rodrigues.

== Geology ==
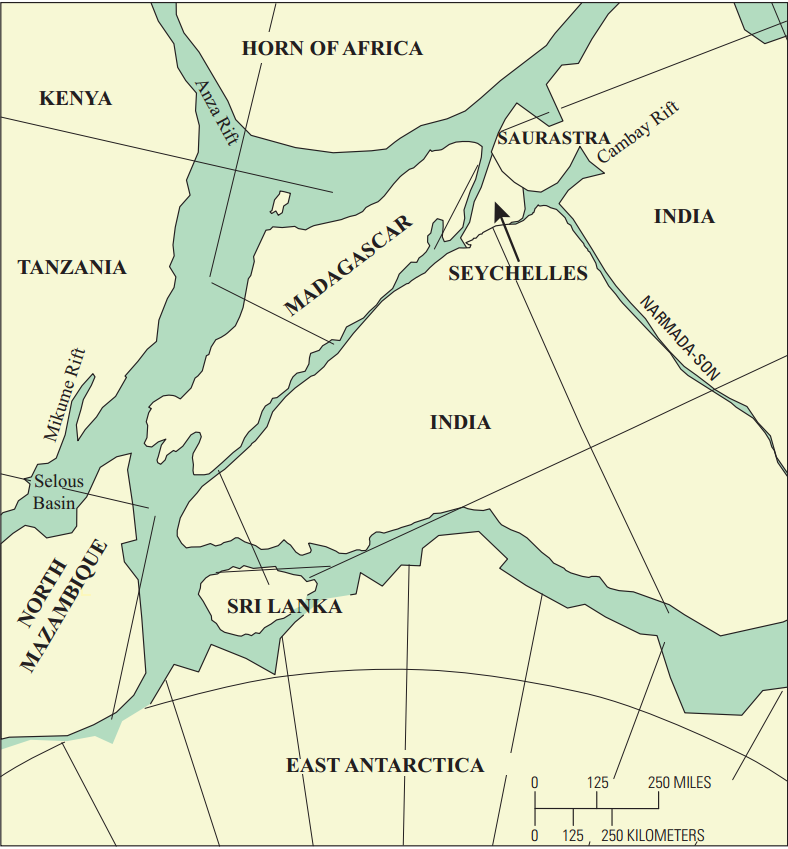
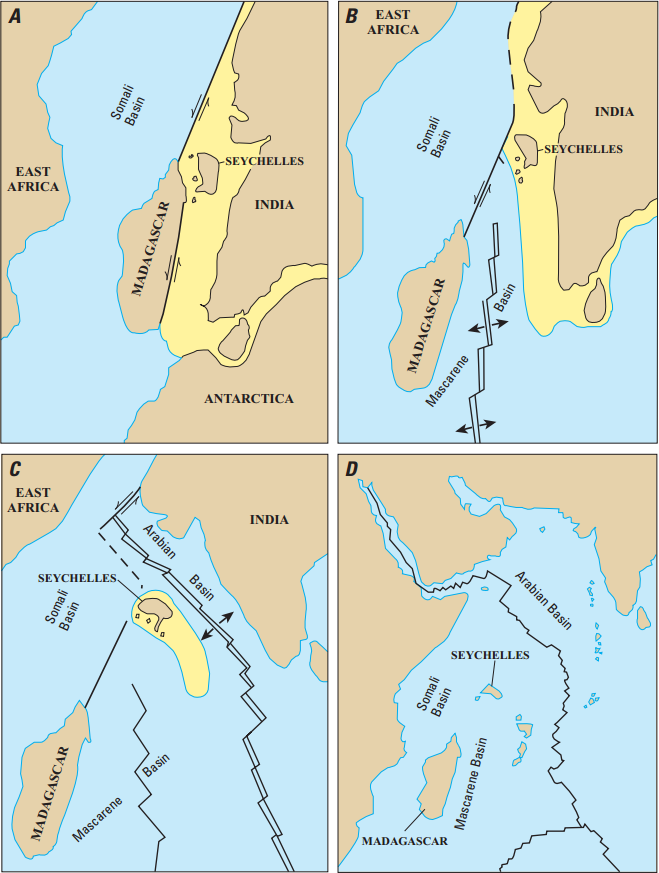
Early Jurassic breakup of Gondwana (left) and A- Early Cretaceous, B- Late Cretaceous, C-Paleocene, D- Present Day (right)

The Indian subcontinent was at one time next to the east coast of Seychelles, but seafloor spreading has moved the landmass to its current position, where it has collided and fused with the continent of Asia.

The northern part of the Mascarene Plateau is formed of granite, and is a fragment of the ancient supercontinent of Gondwana. The granite is topped with deposits of limestone and basalt. The basalt deposits in the Seychelles are from the Deccan Traps eruption, which occurred in the central part of the Indian subcontinent 66 million years ago, at the end of the Cretaceous period.

The southern part of the Mascarene Plateau, also known as Southern Mascarene Plateau (SMP), was formed by the Réunion volcanic hotspot along with the Chagos–Laccadive Ridge. The banks and shoals of the southern part of the Mascarene plateau were once volcanic islands, much like Mauritius and Réunion, which have now sunk or eroded to below sea level or, in the case of the Cargados Carajos, to low coral islands. The Saya de Malha Bank formed 35 million years ago, and the Nazareth Bank and the Cargados Carajos shoals formed later. Limestone banks found on the plateau are the remnants of coral reefs, indicating that the plateau was once a succession of islands. Some of the banks may have been islands as recently as 18,000–6,000 years ago, when sea levels were up to 130 meters lower during the most recent ice age. Mauritius formed 8–10 million years ago, and Rodrigues and Réunion formed around two million years ago. Piton de la Fournaise volcano on Réunion is one of the most active volcanoes in the world.

== See also ==
- Central Indian Ridge – A north-south-trending mid-ocean ridge in the western Indian Ocean
- Geography of Seychelles
- Geology of Seychelles
- Mauritia – A Precambrian microcontinent that broke away as India and Madagascar separated
- Seychelles Microcontinent – A microcontinent underlying the Seychelles Islands in the western Indian Ocean
