= Central Indian Ridge =

North-south-trending mid-ocean ridge in the western Indian Ocean

Bathymetric map of Central Indian Ridge

The Central Indian Ridge (CIR) is a north–south-trending mid-ocean ridge in the western Indian Ocean.

== Geological setting ==
The morphology of the CIR is characteristic of slow to intermediate ridges. The axial valley is 500–1000 m deep; 50–100 km-long ridge segments are separated by 30 km-long transform faults and 10 km-long non-transform discontinuities. Melt supply comes from axial volcanic ridges that are 15 km-long, 1–2 km wide, and reaches 100–200 m above the axial floor.

With a spreading rate of 30 mm/yr near the Equator and 49 mm/yr near the Rodrigues triple junction (RTJ) at its southern end, the CIR is an intermediately fast spreading ridge characterised by moderate obliquity and few large offsets, the obvious exception being the almost 300 km-long Mary Celeste Fracture Zone at 18°S. Between 21°S and the Mary Celeste Fracture Zone (18°S) the CIR deviates westward. Along this section the larger offsets switch from right-lateral to left-lateral but return to right-lateral north of 18°S.

Otherwise, the southern section (RTJ-Argo Fracture Zone, 25°S-13°S) of the CIR is near-orthogonal relative to the spreading direction. North of the Argo FZ it is highly oblique and dominated by numerous small ridge segments. The northern section of the CIR, including the Carlsberg Ridge, trends NNW and lacks fracture zones. The axial depth of the CIR increases from 3200 m at 20°S to 4000 m at the RTJ.

== Boundaries ==
The CIR is traditionally said to separate the African plate from the Indo-Australian plate. Likewise, the Owen fracture zone in the northern end of the CIR is traditionally said to separate the Indian-Australian plate from the Arabian plate. Movements in the Owen Fracture Zone are, however, negligible and Arabia and India are moving as a single plate. This plate, in turn, is separated from the Australian plate by a diffuse boundary, the India–Capricorn boundary, which stretches east from the CIR near Chagos Bank to the Ninety East Ridge and north along the Ninety East Ridge to the northern end of the Sunda Trench. This diffuse boundary was probably initiated in the Late Miocene and is probably related to opening of Gulf of Aden and the uplift of the Himalayas.

== Tectonic history and hotspot interaction ==
The CIR was opened during the separation of the Mascarene Plateau and the Chagos-Laccadive Ridge about 38 Ma, both of which are the products of the Réunion hotspot, the only hotspot known to have interacted with the CIR. Now located 1100 km from the CIR, hotspot crossed the CIR near 18-20°S, from the Indian to the African plate, at 47 Ma. The Réunion hotspot track includes the Chagos-Laccadive Ridge on the Indian plate which leads to the Indian west-coast where the newborn hotspot produced the Deccan Traps in north-west India at 66 Ma.

The only above-water structure near the CIR is the Rodrigues Island, the top of the enigmatic Rodrigues triple junction between Mauritius and the CIR. The Rodrigues Ridge reaches the CIR at 19°S via a series of en echelon ridges known as the Three Magi. Volcanic rocks from the Rodrigues Island are, however, similar to 1,58-1,30 Ma-old rocks from Réunion and Mauritius and the Rodrigues Ridge can't therefore have originated on the CIR leaving the Réunion hotspot the most likely candidate.

== See also ==
- Southeast Indian Ridge
- Southwest Indian Ridge
