= Carlsberg Ridge =

Tectonic plate ridge

Carlsberg Ridge.

The Carlsberg Ridge is the northern section of the Central Indian Ridge, a divergent tectonic plate boundary between the African plate and the Indo-Australian plate, traversing the western regions of the Indian Ocean.

The ridge of which the Carlsberg Ridge is a part extends northward from a triple point junction near the island of Rodrigues (the Rodrigues Triple Point) to a junction with the Owen fracture zone. The ridge started its northwards propagation in the late Maastrichtian and reached the incipient Arabian Sea in the Eocene. Then it continued to accrete basalt but did not propagate for nearly 30 Ma. Then, in the early Miocene it started to propagate westwards towards the Afar hot spot, opening the Gulf of Aden.

The Carlsberg Ridge is seismically active, with a major earthquake being recorded by the United States Geological Survey at 7.6 on the moment magnitude scale on July 15, 2003.

The submarine ridge was discovered by the Danish research vessel Dana during the Carlsberg Foundation's Oceanographic Expedition around the world (1928–1930), better known as the 2nd Dana Expedition, and named after the Carlsberg Foundation, which funded the entire expedition and subsequent analysis and publication of results.
