= Saya de Malha Bank =

Saya de Malha
- Submerged bank Saya de Malha Bank (Indian Ocean)

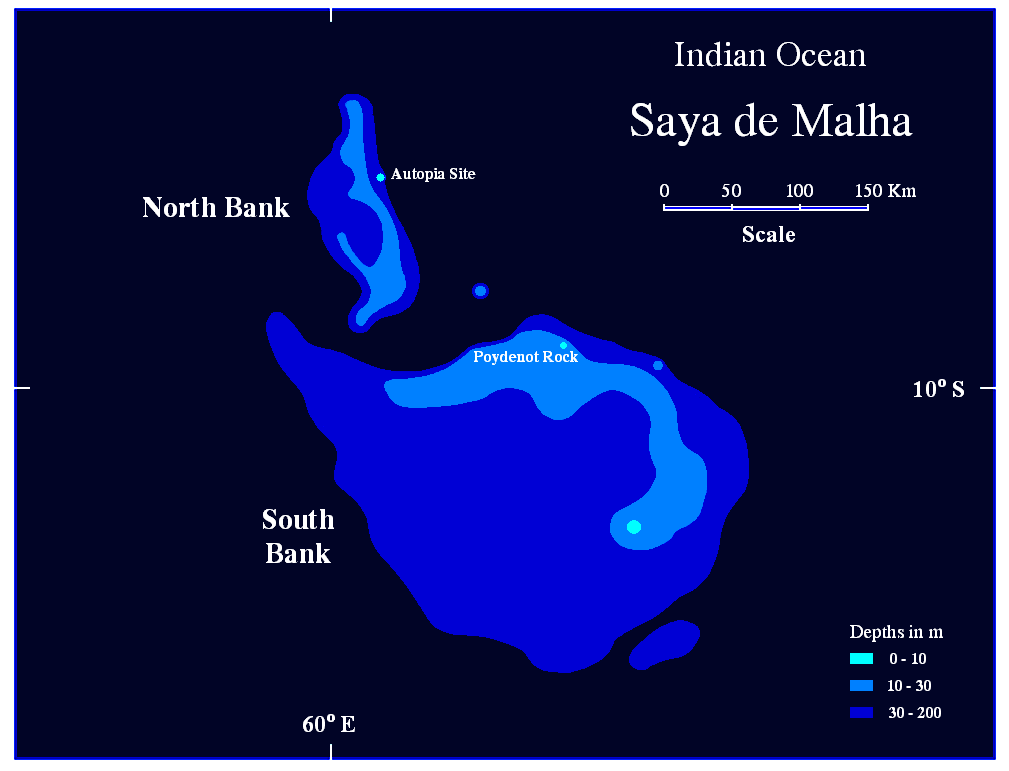
- Map of Saya de Malha
- Interactive map of Saya de Malha
- Coordinates: 10.500°S 61.360°E
- Country: Mauritius

Area
  - Total: 40,808 km^{2} (15,756 sq mi)

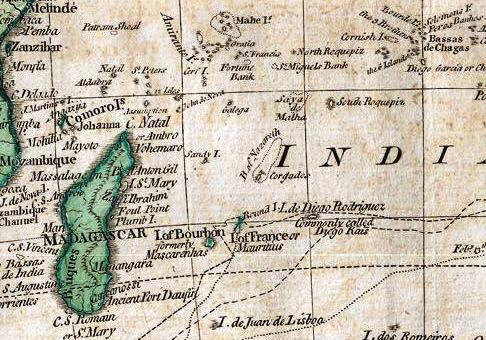
The Saya de Malha Bank and Nazareth Bank on a 1794 Samuel Dunn map section

The Saya de Malha Bank (also the Sahia de Malha Bank, modern Portuguese: saia de malha, English: mesh skirt), or Mesh Skirt Bank, is one of the largest submerged ocean banks in the world, a part of the vast undersea Mascarene Plateau.

== Geography ==
The Saya de Malha Bank lies northeast of Madagascar, southeast of Seychelles, and north of Nazareth Bank, the Cargados Carajos Shoals, and the island of Mauritius, and currently falls mostly under international waters. The closest land is tiny Agaléga (one of the Outer Islands of Mauritius), some 300 km (190 mi) further west, followed by the southern Seychellois island of Coëtivy, some 400 km (250 mi) northwest. Mauritius administers the whole Saya de Malha Bank as a portion of it lies within its exclusive economic zone.

The bank covers an area of 40,808 km^{2} (15,756 sq mi), and is composed of two separate structures, the smaller North Bank (also called Ritchie Bank), and the huge South Bank. If the South Bank were recognized as a submerged atoll structure, it would be the largest of the world, almost three times the size of the Great Chagos Bank, commonly considered the largest atoll structure of the world. Even smaller North Bank would be one of the largest atolls worldwide. The North Bank and the South Bank appear to have different origins, since they are separated by a fault. The South Bank and the Great Chagos Bank were one single feature until about 64 to 69 million years ago, when an ocean ridge opened between them and started pushing them apart.

The Saya de Malha Bank consists of a series of narrow shoals, with depths from 17 to 29 m (56 to 95 ft) on the rim. They are arranged in a semicircular manner, around a space, the former lagoon, about 73 m (240 ft) deep, which slopes on the Southeast. Some areas of the bank are shallow, less than 10 m (33 ft) below the surface. The banks are covered with sea grass interspersed with small coral reefs. Due to its remote location, the bank is among the least-studied shallow marine ecoregions on the planet. The banks are a breeding ground for humpback whales and blue whales.

== Geology ==
The bank was formed 35 million years ago by the Réunion hotspot, and is composed of basaltic basal rock overlain with limestone. The limestone banks found on the plateau are the remnants of coral reefs. Millions of years ago, the bank was one or more mountainous volcanic islands, like present-day Mauritius and Réunion, which subsequently sank below the waves due to thermal subsidence. Yet reef building and biogenic production of carbonate mineral maintained the bank near sea level until the late Neogene, at which time the intensification of the South Equatorial Current, at which point the platform drowned. During the Pleistocene glacial periods, parts of the bank were above relative sea level, forming islands. During the most recent ice age large areas of the bank were above water but were submerged entirely by around 8000 years ago.

== History ==
The bank was named by Portuguese explorers 500 years ago, who encountered the bank on the voyage between the Cape of Good Hope and India. After traversing miles of deep blue Indian Ocean, they found themselves sailing above a shallow area of the bank, covered with swaying green seagrass.

The first scientific survey of the bank was undertaken by Captain Robert Moresby of the Royal Navy in 1838. Moresby previously surveyed the Laccadives, the Red Sea, the Maldives and the Chagos Banks. Due to Moresby's ill health, the Saya de Malha bank was his last survey in a long career exploring and charting the archipelagos and reefs of the Indian Ocean.

=== Artificial island project ===
The Saya de Malha Bank is the site of an attempt to create an artificial island by Prof. Wolf Hilbertz (1938-2007) and Dr. Thomas J. Goreau. Hilbertz created seacrete or biorock by utilizing electricity to accrete the minerals in sea water onto a metal structure. The artificial coral thus far created has high enough tensile strength to be used as building material. With others, Hilbertz and Goreau made two expeditions to the bank in 1997 and 2002. They attempted to create or grow an island around a steel structure that has been anchored to the North Bank sea floor at a depth of 11 m (36 ft). Some sources say that the island would have been named Autopia or Autopia Saya, and declared a micronation.

Excerpt from an online interview with Wolf Hilbertz in Celestopea Times, 2004:

You and your discovery of accreting minerals in seawater into solid forms has inspired several groups over the years to contemplate creating artificial islands for their piece of paradise. Your name has been linked to some such as Autopia Ampere and Skerki Bank. Is there an update on either of those projects or words of encouragement for others seeking something similar?

Examining the geography and bathymetry of the globe to find a spot in the ocean where to establish a permanent research settlement I came upon Seamount Ampere, east of Gibraltar, and Skerki Bank near Sicily. Both sites had potential, but Saya de Malha Banks in the NE Indian Ocean eclipsed them all. Having about the size of Belgium, most of Saya lies in international waters, 'in the high seas' legally speaking, governed only by the U.N. Law of the Sea. In 1997, Goreau and I sailed to Saya de Malha's many shallow sites and established the first accretion structure there, powered by floating photovoltaics and thus claiming the banks. In 2002 the second Saya de Malha Expedition with three boats laid the foundation of Autopia Saya, powered by photovoltaics, and performed the first modern bathymetric surveys ever conducted in the area. The latest Saya de Malha Expedition Report is on our websites. We are busy now organizing a third expedition to get Autopia Saya growing above sea level.

Mauritius claims part of the Saya de Malha Bank as part of its exclusive economic zone.

== Ecology ==
The Saya de Malha was considered one of the world's largest seagrass fields, and serves as a carbon sink. However, recent seafloor survey of the center and south of the bank found no seagrass, with most of the shallower part of the bank's seafloor hosting corals and coralline algae and the deeper foraminiferal sand.

Because it is located in international waters, the bank's biodiversity is under threat from fishing and deep sea mining. Fishing fleets from Sri Lanka, Thailand, Taiwan have exploited the ecosystem in various ways, including trawling the ocean floor, longlining and gillnetting. There are no major binding international treaties that protect the bank from exploitation. Instead, economic activity on the bank is governed by the Southern Indian Oceans Fisheries Agreement, a voluntary agreement which only applies to its signatories. Waters near the Saya de Malha have also been considered as potential sites for rare-earth minerals mining, which could raise sediment from the ocean floor and disrupt seagrass photosynthesis.

== See also ==
- Hawkins Bank
- Nazareth Bank
- Robert Moresby
- Soudan Banks
