= Chagos–Laccadive Ridge =

Volcanic ridge and oceanic plateau between the Northern and Central Indian Ocean

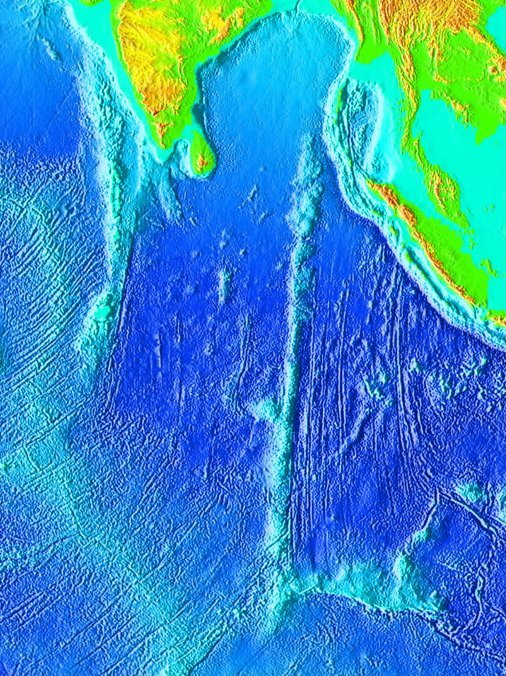
Several prominent features of the Indian Ocean: Chagos-Lakshadweep Ridge (upper left), Ninety East Ridge (centre), Central Indian Ridge (left), and Broken Ridge (bottom right)

The Chagos–Lakshadweep Ridge (CLR), also known as the Chagos–Lakshadweep Plateau, is a prominent volcanic ridge and oceanic plateau extending between the Northern and the Central Indian Ocean. Laccadive is an anglicized adaptation of the word Lakṣadvīpa which means "One Hundred Thousand Islands". After 1973, the Indian government de-recognized the colonial word "Laccadive" and renamed it "Lakshadweep" as per local lingua franca.

Extending from c. 10°S to 15°N, the CLR includes the Lakshadweep, Maldives, and Chagos archipelagos and can be divided into three corresponding blocks, of which the first is continental and the two latter are oceanic. The CLR is asymmetrical with a steeper eastern slope and has an average depth of less than 1,000 m (3,300 ft). It formed south of or near the Equator together with the remaining western continental margin of India, when India separated first from Madagascar in the Mid-Cretaceous and then from the Seychelles Islands in the Late Cretaceous.

== Extent ==
The CLR extends northward for c. 2,550 km (1,580 mi) from 10°S at the southern end of the Chagos Archipelago to 14°N around the Adas Bank. The second element of the name is for the Lakshadweep Islands, among the islands of Lakshadweep. The islands of Chagos, Maldives and Lakshadweep are the above-water parts of the Chagos–Lakshadweep Ridge.

The Lakshadweep Ridge, the northern part of the CLR, parallels the Indian west coast (8°N–16°N) and has an average width of 270 km (170 mi). It is separated from the flanking basins by fault scarps made of thick, high-density crust. It is made of thinned continental crust marked by the volcanism that occurred near the K-Pg boundary c. 66 Ma.

The western coastal margin of the Indian subcontinent was affected by two large igneous provinces at 85 Ma and 65 Ma. This left a complex of ridges that run parallel to the west coast of which the Lakshadweep Ridge is the larger. A complex of considerably smaller ridges constitutes a northern extension to the CLR. The Laxmi Ridge, the larger of these, is made of continental crust and formed during the Seychelles-India breakup. East of the Laxmi Ridge in the Laxmi Basin, the Panikkar Ridge is made of stretched continental crust and has a similar tectonic history. In contrast, the Palitana Ridge north of the Panikkar Ridge probably represents an extinct spreading centre and on the nearby shelf and slope a lineament, known as the Prathap Ridge Complex, is similarly made of oceanic crust and both are probably leftovers from the India–Madagascar breakup.

== Formation ==
The vast Chagos–Lakshadweep Ridge contains a considerable amount of volcanic rock, as does the southern part of the Mascarene Plateau. Although the Chagos–Lakshadweep Ridge is an aseismic ridge, between 1965 and 1970 an unusual, isolated swarm of earthquakes occurred on the west side of the Great Chagos Bank at approximately 6°00′S 71°20′E. It is unknown, but of considerable interest, how much continental crust exists at depth beneath the ridge.

== See also ==
- Central Indian Ridge
