= Réunion hotspot =

Volcanic hotspot in the Indian Ocean

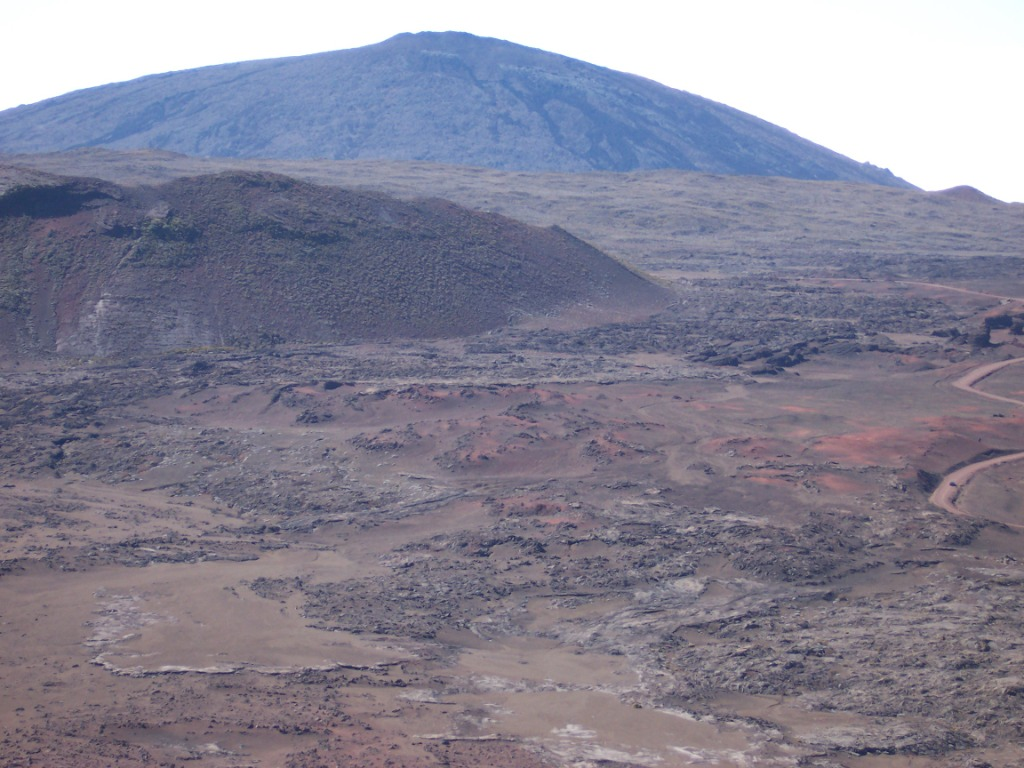
- Piton de la Fournaise, an active shield volcano formed by the Réunion hotspot
- Country: France
- Region: Réunion
- Coordinates: 21.1°S 55.5°E

The Réunion hotspot is a volcanic hotspot which currently lies under the island of Réunion in the Indian Ocean. The Chagos-Laccadive Ridge and the southern part of the Mascarene Plateau are volcanic traces of the Réunion hotspot.

The hotspot is believed to have been active for over 65 million years. A huge eruption of this hotspot 65 million years ago is thought to have laid down the Deccan Traps, a vast bed of basalt lava that covers part of central India, and opened a rift which separated India from the Seychelles Plateau. The Deccan Traps eruption coincided roughly with the nearly antipodal Chicxulub impactor and the Cretaceous–Paleogene extinction of the dinosaurs, and there is considerable speculation that the three events were related. As the Indian plate drifted north, the hotspot continued to punch through the plate, creating a string of volcanic islands and undersea plateaux. The Laccadive Islands, the Maldives, and the Chagos Archipelago are atolls resting on former volcanoes created 60–45 million years ago that subsequently submerged below sea level. About 45 million years ago the Central Indian Ridge crossed over the hotspot, and the hotspot passed under the African Plate.

The hotspot appears to have been relatively quiet 45–10 million years ago, when activity resumed, creating the Mascarene Islands, which include Mauritius, Réunion, and Rodrigues. Mauritius and Rodrigues Ridge were created 8–10 million years ago, and Rodrigues and Réunion Islands in the last two million years. Piton de la Fournaise, a shield volcano on the southeastern corner of Réunion, is one of the most active volcanoes in the world.
