= Deccan Traps =

Large igneous province in India

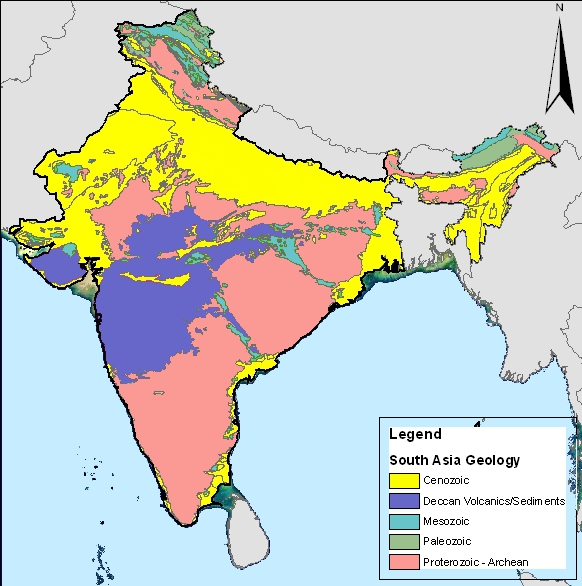
Geologic map of India, showing the Deccan Traps in blue-purple

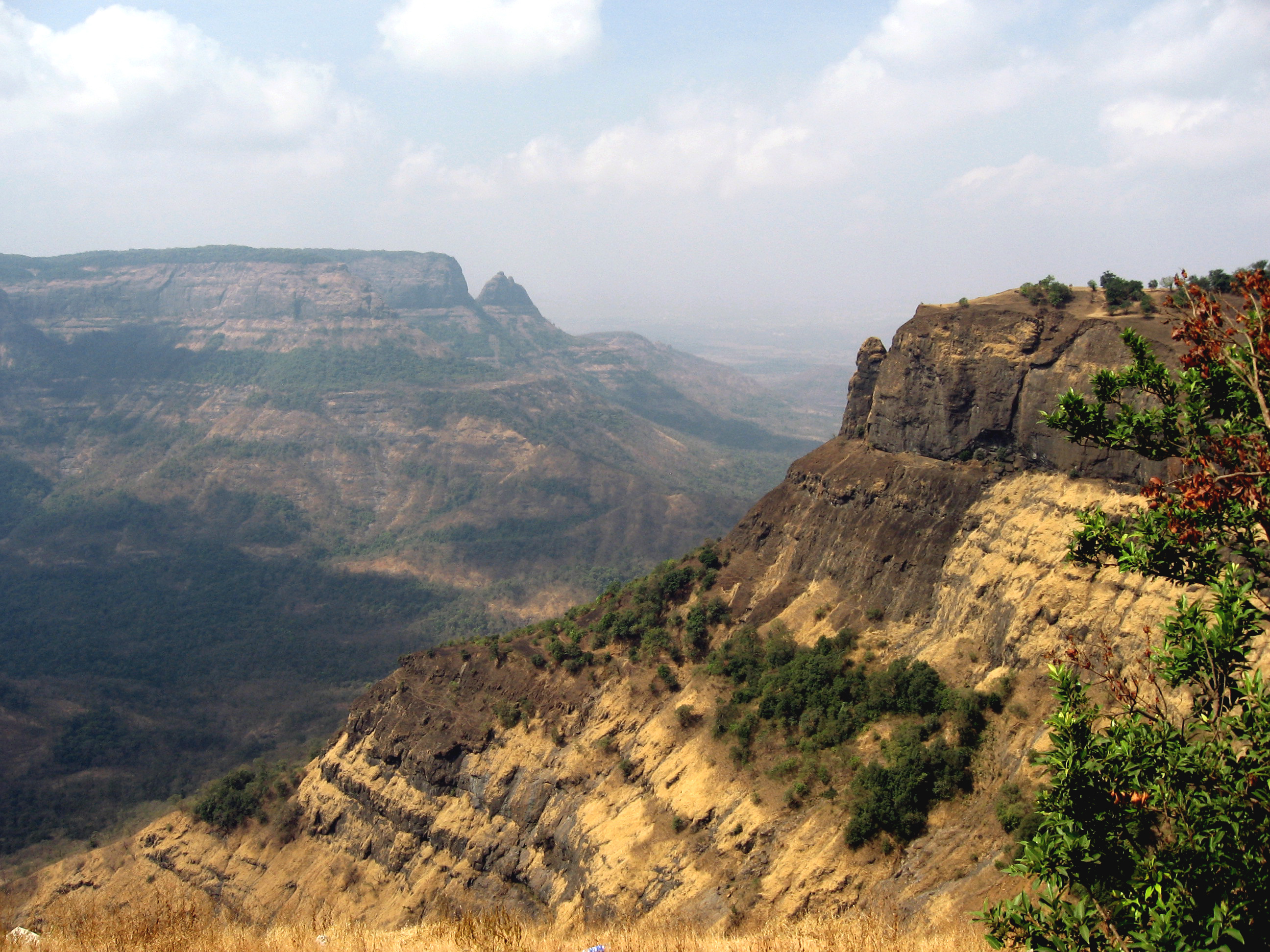
The Western Ghats at Matheran in Maharashtra

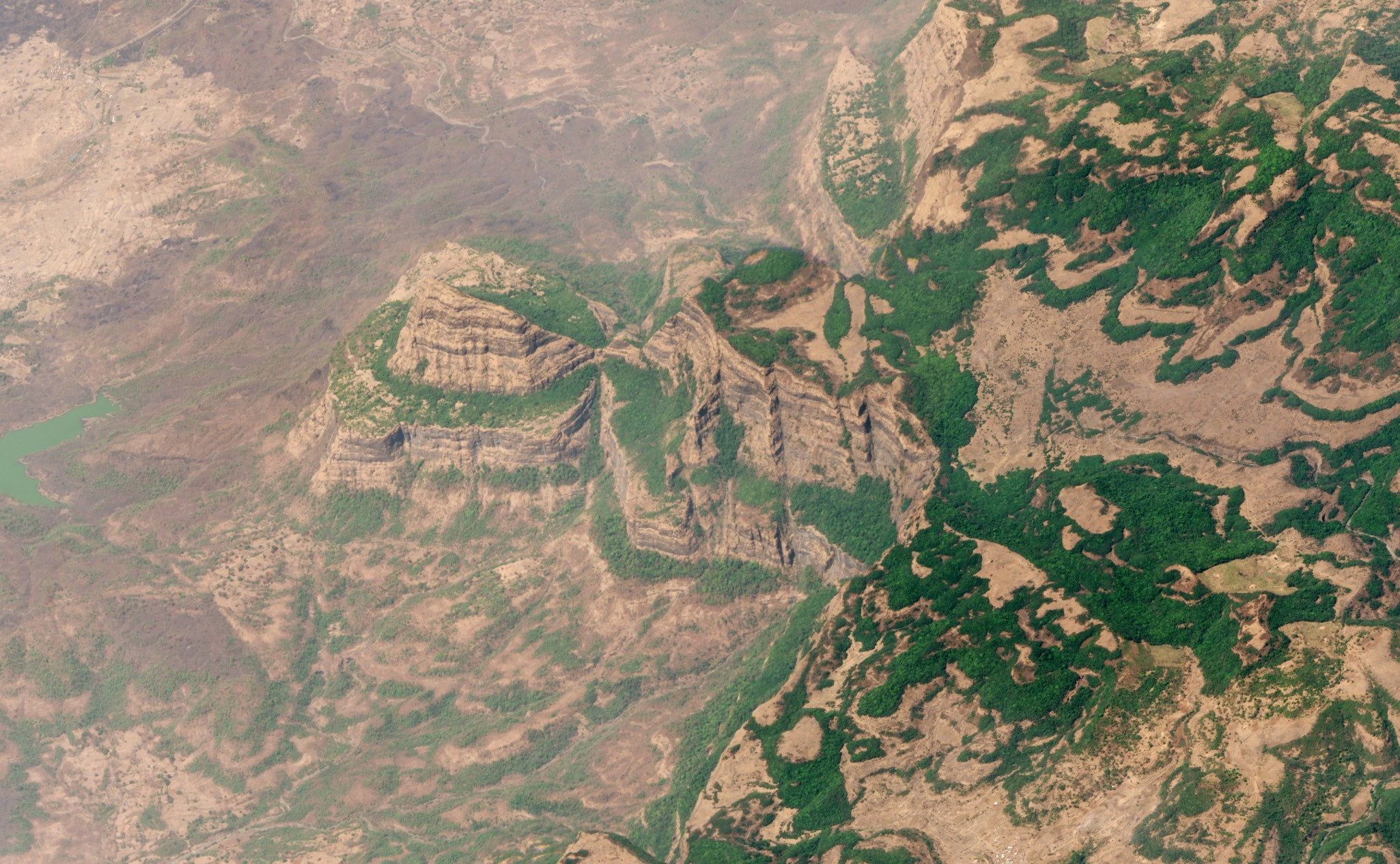
Oblique satellite view of the Deccan Traps

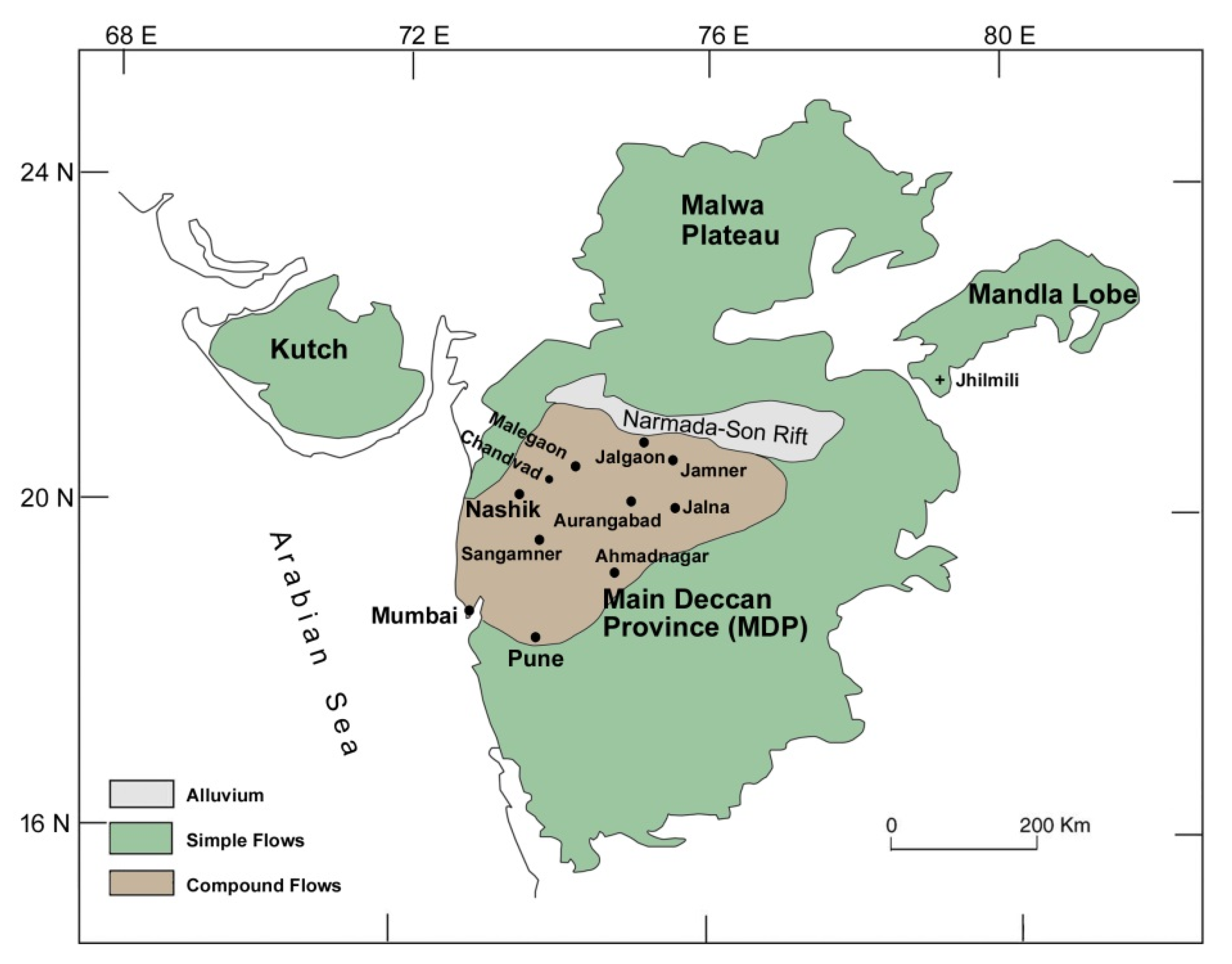
Map of the Deccan Traps

The Deccan Traps are a large igneous province of west-central India (17–24°N, 73–74°E). They are one of the largest volcanic features on Earth, with lava erupted from multiple volcanic centres. The Traps consist of many layers of solidified flood basalt that together are more than about 2 kilometres (1.2 mi) thick, cover an area of about 500,000 square kilometres (200,000 sq mi), and have a volume of about 1 million km^{3} (200,000 cu mi). Originally, the Deccan Traps may have covered about 1.5 million km^{2} (600,000 sq mi), with a correspondingly larger original volume. This volume overlies the Archean age Indian Shield, which is likely the lithology the province passed through during eruption. The province is commonly divided into four subprovinces: the main Deccan, the Malwa Plateau, the Mandla Lobe and the Saurashtran Plateau.

The eruptions occurred over a 600,000-to-800,000-year time period between around 66.3 to 65.6 million years ago, spanning the Cretaceous–Paleogene boundary. While some authors initially suggested the eruptions were a major cause of the Cretaceous–Paleogene mass extinction event at roughly the same time, this theory has been rejected as a result of research into the Chicxulub impact, now thought to be the primary cause of the extinction. While some scholars continue to argue the eruptions may have contributed, it is now generally accepted that the Deccan eruptions played a minor role at most or may have even partially negated the effects of the impact.

The Deccan Traps are thought to have been produced in major part by the still active Réunion hotspot, responsible for the creation of the modern Mascarene Islands in the Indian Ocean.

== Etymology ==
The term trap has been used in geology since 1785–1795 for such rock formations. It is derived from the Swedish word for stairs (trapp) and refers to the step-like hills forming the landscape of the region. The name Deccan has Sanskrit origins meaning "southern".

== History ==
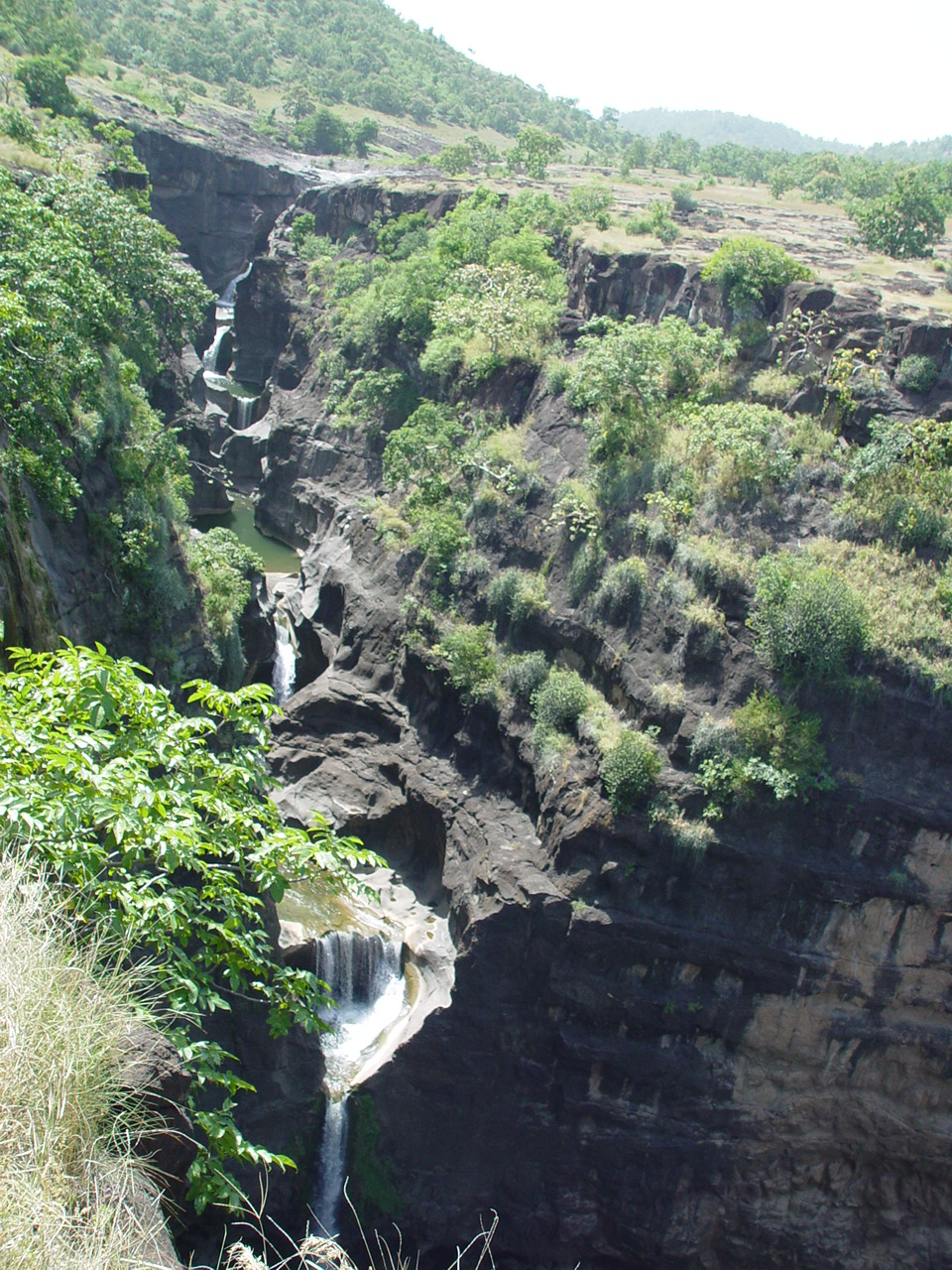
Deccan Traps at Ajanta Caves

The Deccan Traps began forming 66.25 million years ago, at the end of the Cretaceous period, although it is possible that some of the oldest material may underlie younger material. The bulk of the volcanic eruption occurred at the Western Ghats between 66 and 65 million years ago when lava began to extrude in fissure eruptions. Determining the exact age for Deccan rock is made difficult by a number of limitations, one being that the transition between eruption events may have lasted only a few thousand years and the resolution of dating methods is not sufficient to pinpoint these events. In this way, determining the rate of magma emplacement is also difficult to constrain. This series of eruptions may have lasted for less than 30,000 years.

The original area covered by the lava flows is estimated to have been as large as 1.5 million km^{2} (0.58 million sq mi), approximately half the size of modern India. The Deccan Traps region was reduced to its current size by erosion and plate tectonics; the present area of directly observable lava flows is around 500,000 km^{2} (200,000 sq mi).

The Deccan Traps are segmented into three stratigraphic units: the Upper, Middle and Lower traps. While it was previously interpreted that these groups represented their own key points in the sequence of events in Deccan extrusion, it is now more widely accepted that these horizons relate more closely to paleotopography and distance from the eruption site.

== Effect on mass extinctions and climate ==
The release of volcanic gases, particularly sulfur dioxide, during the formation of the traps may have contributed to climate change. An average drop in temperature of about 2 °C (3.6 °F) was recorded during this period.

Because of its magnitude, some scientists (notably Gerta Keller) have speculated that the gases released during the formation of the Deccan Traps played a major role in the Cretaceous–Paleogene (K–Pg) extinction event (also known as the Cretaceous–Tertiary or K–T extinction). It has been theorized that sudden cooling due to sulfurous volcanic gases released by the formation of the traps and toxic gas emissions may have contributed significantly to the K–Pg mass extinction. However, the current consensus among the scientific community is that the extinction was primarily triggered by the Chicxulub impact event in North America, which will have produced a sunlight-blocking dust cloud that killed much of the plant life and reduced global temperature (this cooling is called an impact winter).

A 2014 study suggested the extinction may have been caused by both the volcanism and the impact event. This was followed by a similar study in 2015, both of which consider the hypothesis that the impact exacerbated or induced the Deccan volcanism, since the events occurred approximately at antipodes. A 2020 study questioned the idea that the Deccan Traps were a contributory factor at all, suggesting that the Deccan Traps eruptions may have even partially negated the climatic change induced by the impact.

A major criticism of the Deccan Traps as the primary cause of the extinctions is that the extinction event appears to be globally geologically instantaneous and simultaneous in both marine and terrestrial environments, as would be expected from an impact cause, rather than staggered as would be expected from a large igneous province.

A more recent discovery appears to demonstrate the scope of the destruction from the impact alone, however. In a March 2019 article in the Proceedings of the National Academy of Sciences, an international team of twelve scientists revealed the contents of the Tanis fossil site discovered near Bowman, North Dakota, that appeared to show a devastating mass destruction of an ancient lake and its inhabitants at the time of the Chicxulub impact. In the paper, the group reports that the geology of the site is strewn with fossilized trees and remains of fish and other animals. The lead researcher, Robert A. DePalma of the University of Kansas, was quoted in The New York Times as stating that "You would be blind to miss the carcasses sticking out... It is impossible to miss when you see the outcrop". Evidence correlating this find to the Chicxulub impact included tektites bearing "the unique chemical signature of other tektites associated with the Chicxulub event" found in the gills of fish fossils and embedded in amber, an iridium-rich top layer that is considered another signature of the event, and an atypical lack of evidence for scavenging, perhaps suggesting that there were few survivors. The exact mechanism of the site's destruction has been debated as either an impact-caused tsunami or lake and river seiche activity triggered by post-impact earthquakes, though there has yet been no firm conclusion upon which researchers have settled.

A 2024 study of glycerol dialkyl glycerol tetraether levels in fossilized peat found that the Deccan Traps caused long-term warming of around 3 °C over the course of the final 100,000 years of the Maastrichtian, as well as about 5 °C drop in temperature for less than 10,000 years around 30,000 years prior to the K–Pg boundary (coinciding with the peak of the Poladpur eruptive phase), but by the time of the K–Pg boundary, global temperatures had returned to previous levels. This suggests that the Deccan Traps were not the primary cause of extinction.

== Petrology ==
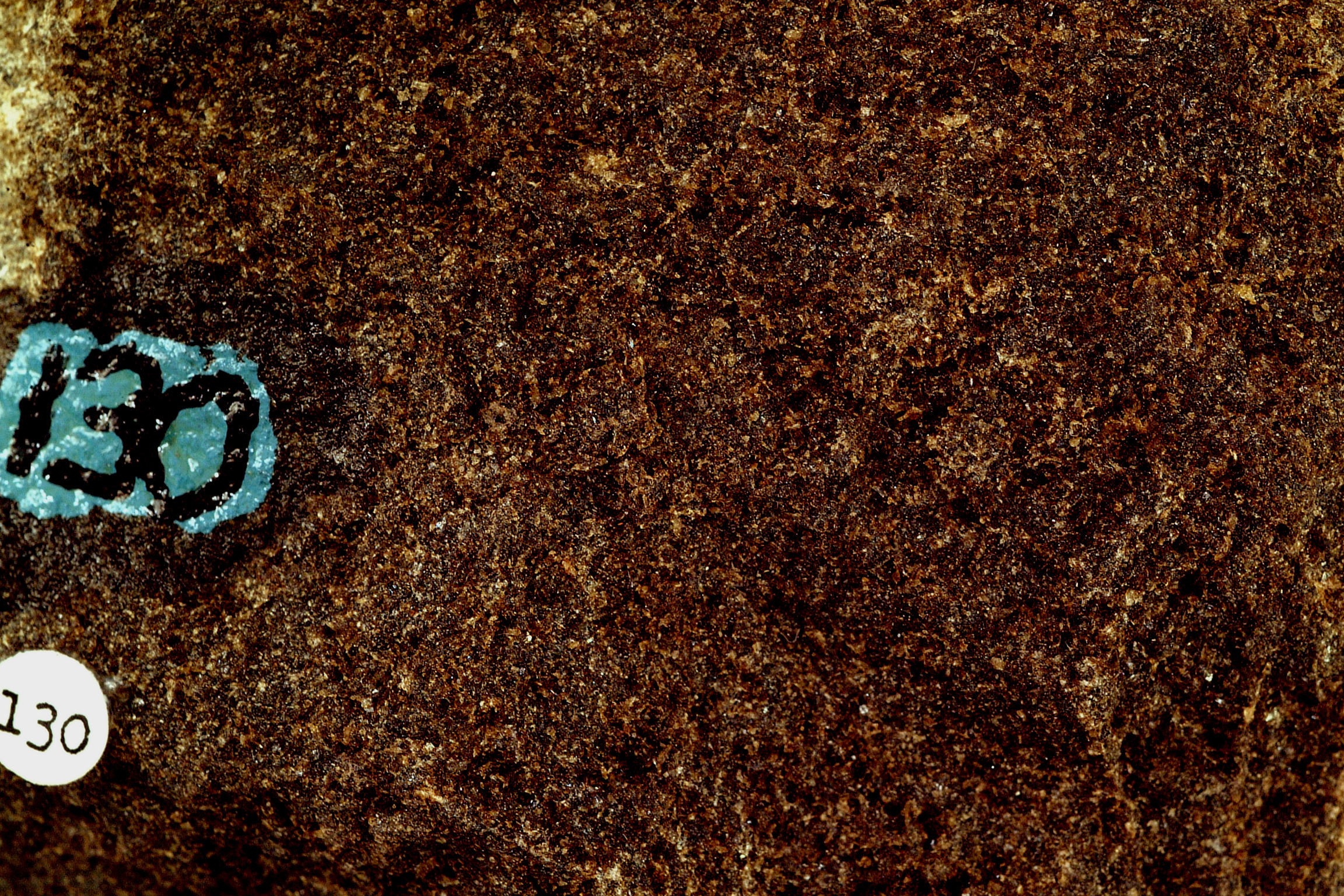
Sample of tholeiitic basalt from the Deccan Traps

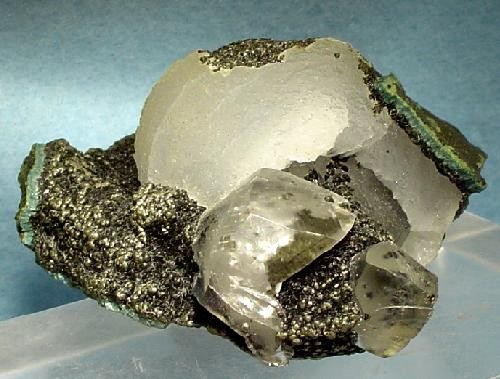
Crystals of epistilbite and calcite in a vug in Deccan Traps basalt lava from Jalgaon District, Maharashtra

Within the Deccan Traps, at least 95% of the lavas are tholeiitic basalts. Major mineral constituents are olivine, pyroxenes and plagioclase, as well as certain Fe-Ti-rich oxides. These magmas are <7% MgO. However, many of these minerals are observed as highly altered forms. Other rock types present include alkali basalt, nephelinite, lamprophyre and carbonatite.

Mantle xenoliths have been described from Kachchh (northwestern India) and elsewhere in the western Deccan and contain spinel lherzolite and pyroxenite constituents.

While the Deccan traps have been categorized in many different ways including the three different stratigraphic groups, geochemically the province can be split into as many as eleven different formations. Many of the petrologic differences in these units are a product of varying degrees of crustal contamination.

== Fossils ==
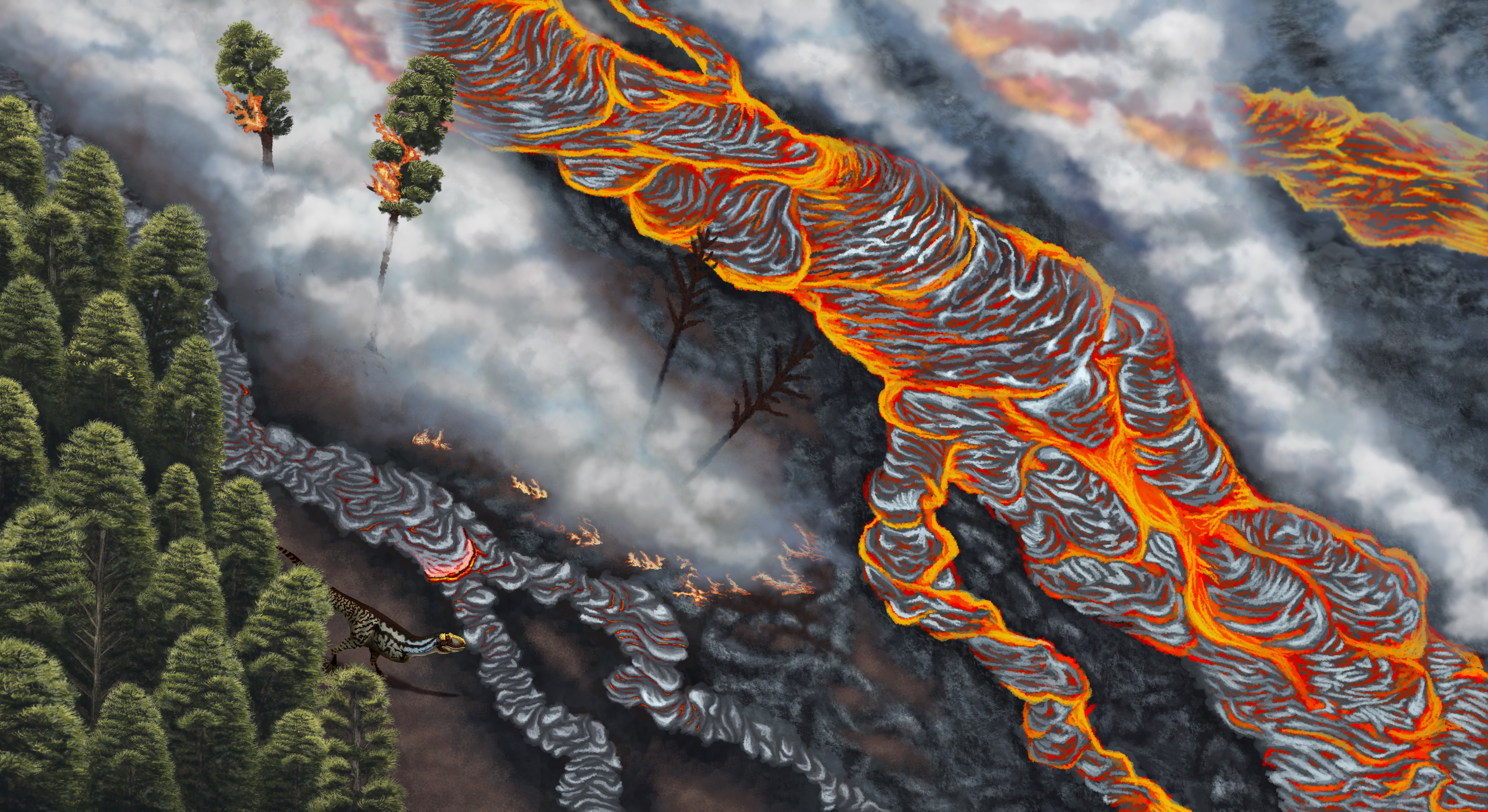
Paleoart of the Deccan trap during the Late Cretaceous

The Deccan Traps are famous for the beds of fossils that have been found between layers of lava. Particularly well-known species include the frog Oxyglossus pusillus (Owen) of the Eocene of India and the toothed frog Indobatrachus, an early lineage of modern frogs, which is now placed in the Australian family Myobatrachidae. The Infratrappean Beds (Lameta Formation) and Intertrappean Beds also contain fossil freshwater molluscs.

== Theories of formation ==
It is postulated that the Deccan Traps eruption was associated with a deep mantle plume. High ^{3}He/^{4}He ratios of the main pulse of the eruption are often seen in magmas with mantle plume origin. The area of long-term eruption (the hotspot), known as the Réunion hotspot, is suspected of both causing the Deccan Traps eruption and opening the rift that separated the Mascarene Plateau from India. Regional crustal thinning supports the theory of this rifting event and likely encouraged the rise of the plume in this area. Seafloor spreading at the boundary between the Indian and African Plates subsequently pushed India north over the plume, which now lies under Réunion island in the Indian Ocean, southwest of India. The mantle plume model has, however, been challenged.

Data continues to emerge that supports the plume model. The motion of the Indian tectonic plate and the eruptive history of the Deccan traps show strong correlations. Based on data from marine magnetic profiles, a pulse of unusually rapid plate motion began at the same time as the first pulse of Deccan flood basalts, which is dated at 67 million years ago. The spreading rate rapidly increased and reached a maximum at the same time as the peak basaltic eruptions. The spreading rate then dropped off, with the decrease occurring around 63 million years ago, by which time the main phase of Deccan volcanism ended. This correlation is seen as driven by plume dynamics.

The motions of the Indian and African plates have also been shown to be coupled, the common element being the position of these plates relative to the location of the Réunion plume head. The onset of accelerated motion of India coincides with a large slowing of the rate of counterclockwise rotation of Africa. The close correlations between the plate motions suggest that they were both driven by the force of the Réunion plume.

When comparing the Na_{8}, Fe_{8} and Si_{8} contents of the Deccan to other major igneous provinces, the Deccan appears to have undergone the greatest degree of melting suggesting a deep plume origin. Olivine appears to have fractionated at near-Moho depths with additional fractionation of gabbro ~6 km below the surface. Features such as widespread faulting, frequent diking events, high heat flux, and positive gravity anomalies suggest that the extrusive phase of the Deccan Traps is associated with the existence of a triple junction which may have existed during the Late Cretaceous, having been caused by a deep mantle plume. Not all of these diking events are attributed to large-scale contributions to the overall flow volume. It can be difficult, however, to locate the largest dikes as they are often located towards the west coast and are therefore believed to currently reside under water.

== Suggested link to impact events ==
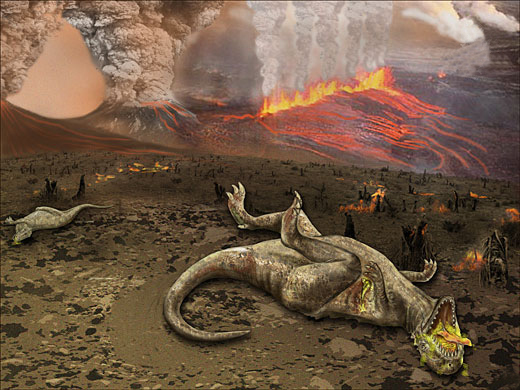
An illustration of the Deccan Trap eruption that may have caused the extinction of the dinosaurs

=== Chicxulub crater ===
Although the Deccan Traps began erupting well before the impact, in a 2015 study it was proposed based on argon–argon dating that the impact may have caused an increase in permeability that allowed magma to reach the surface and produced the most voluminous flows, accounting for around 70% of the volume. The combination of the asteroid impact and the resulting increase in eruptive volume may have been responsible for the mass extinctions that occurred at the time that separates the Cretaceous and Paleogene periods, known as the K–Pg boundary. However this proposal has been questioned by other authors, who describe the suggestion as being "convenient interpretations based on superficial and cursory observations."

=== Shiva crater ===
A geological structure that exists in the sea floor off the west coast of India has been suggested as a possible impact crater, in this context called the Shiva crater. It was also dated approximately 66 million years ago, potentially matching the Deccan traps. The researchers claiming that this feature is an impact crater suggest that the impact may have been the triggering event for the Deccan Traps as well as contributing to the acceleration of the Indian plate in the early Paleogene. However, the current consensus in the Earth science community is that this feature is unlikely to be an actual impact crater.

== See also ==
- Columbia River Basalt Group
- Emeishan Traps
- Geology of India
- Krishna Godavari Basin
- Lameta Formation
- List of flood basalt provinces
- List of volcanoes in India
- Siberian Traps
- Verneshot
- Viluy traps
