= 2004 Tasman Sea earthquake =

- Location within Oceania
- UTC time: 2004-12-23 14:59:04
- ISC event: 7451126
- USGS-ANSS: ComCat
- Local date: 24 December 2004
- Local time: 01:59:04 AEDT; 03:59:04 NZDT
- Duration: 100 seconds
- Magnitude: 8.1 M_{w}
- Depth: 10.0 km (6 mi) (USGS); 4.4 km (3 mi) (ISC-GEM)
- Epicenter: 49.312°S 161.345°E
- Type: Strike-slip
- Total damage: Limited
- Max. intensity: MMI V (Moderate)
- Tsunami: 0.3 m (0.98 ft) in Jackson Bay.
- Aftershocks: Yes
- Casualties: None

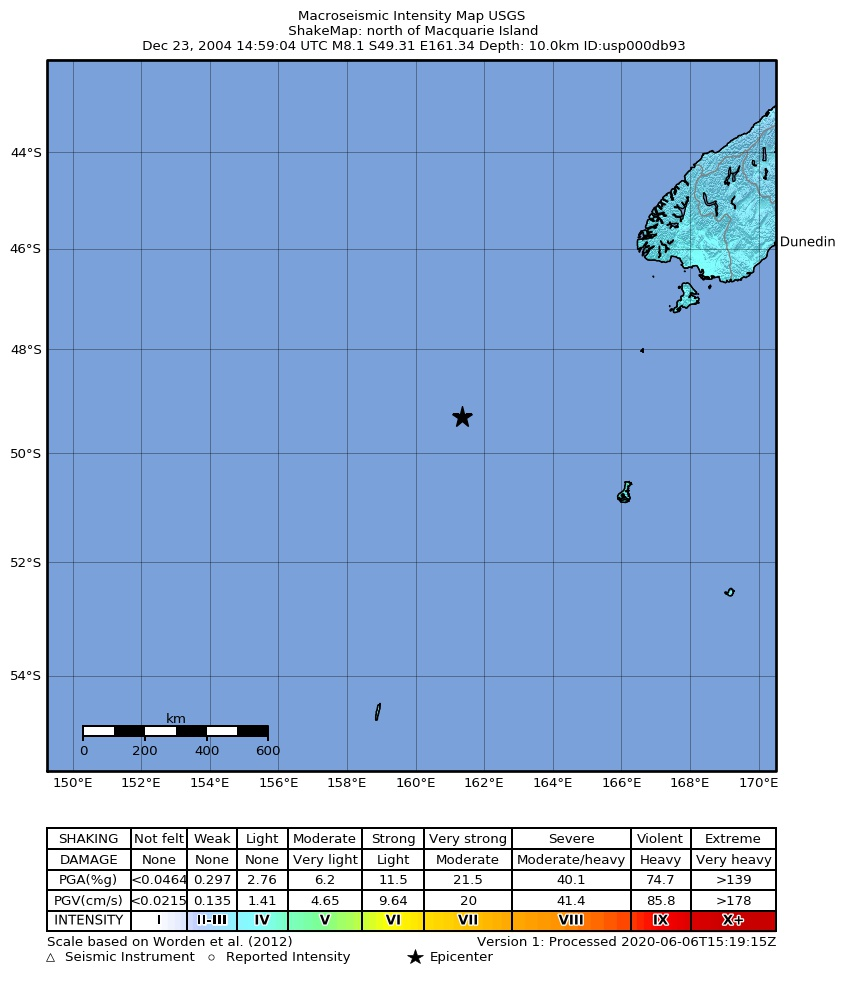
Shakemap of the 2004 Tasman sea M 8.1 earthquake.

In the early morning hours of Friday 24 December 2004, a moment magnitude 8.1 earthquake struck a remote area of the southern Tasman Sea. Its epicentre was located roughly 360 km (224 mi) northwest of the Auckland Islands of New Zealand, and roughly 600 km (373 mi) north of Macquarie Island of Australia. Shaking was reportedly felt as far as Tasmania and the South Island. The event was a complex intraplate earthquake within the Australian plate, which generated a small tsunami.

== Tectonic setting ==
The region to the south of New Zealand involves a complex boundary between the Pacific plate and the Australian plate. Immediately to the south of the South Island is the Puysegur Trench, where the Australian plate is subducting obliquely under the Pacific plate. To the south of this, the Macquarie Fault Zone is a dextral (right lateral) transform boundary. Further south, the Australian plate is subducting underneath the Pacific plate once again at the Hjort Trench. These rapid transitions between boundary types are the result of the boundary being located close to the Australia-Pacific pole of rotation.

The Macquarie Fault Zone was originally a divergent boundary. At divergent boundaries, the spreading ridges are offset from each other and separated by small sections of transform faulting. Fracture zones within the tectonic plates are created as continuations of these transform faults. Roughly 29 million years ago, the Australia-Pacific pole of rotation began to quickly migrate to the southeast, resulting in the boundary transitioning from a divergent boundary to a transform boundary over the span of about 4 million years. As a result of this transition, the fracture zones of the original divergent boundary have separated from each other and have curved to become more tangential to the plate boundary as they get closer to it. The area of fracturing within the Australian plate is known interchangeably as the Macquarie Block or the Puysegur Block.

== Earthquake ==
The earthquake occurred at a shallow depth and had a moment magnitude of 8.1, with its epicentre being located roughly 150 km (93 mi) to the west of the boundary between the Australian and Pacific plates. The earthquake was a sinistral (left lateral) strike-slip event, with the rupture being 257 km (160 mi) in length. The rupture lasted roughly 100 seconds. Roughly 30 seconds into the rupture, a second subevent was observed to have occurred to the west of the main rupture, which lasted roughly 60 seconds.

The rupture occurred on one of the many ancient fracture zones within the Macquarie Block, known as Fracture Zone 5 or the Lhuwa Fracture Zone. This fracture zone curves sharply as it approaches the plate boundary, and the epicentre of the earthquake was located where the fracture zone curves the sharpest. As a result, the fracture zone ruptured bilaterally; roughly 100 km (62 mi) ruptured to the south of the epicentre and roughly 160 km (99 mi) ruptured to the northwest of the epicentre.

It is hypothesised that at the Puysegur Trench, the thicker continental crust of New Zealand is acting as a buttress which impedes the movement of the Australian plate. This results in the steep angle of subduction observed at the trench, and transfers stresses down into the Macquarie Block farther south, where the ancient fracture zones are pre-existing areas of crustal weakness. The stress that is imparted into the Macquarie Block is released through the rupture of these weak fracture zones, and this is believed to have been the cause behind this earthquake.

=== Aftershocks ===
The USGS recorded 42 aftershocks greater than magnitude 4.0 within the year after the earthquake. The largest of these was a magnitude 6.1 earthquake on 3 January 2005.

=== Other events ===
On Tuesday 23 May 1989, a magnitude 8.0 earthquake struck the plate boundary farther south near Macquarie Island. After this event, a large section of the southern end of the Macquarie Block was reactivated, with many smaller earthquakes occurring to the northwest of the plate boundary along one of the fracture zones. However, the fracture zone that was reactivated by the 1989 event was not the same fracture zone which ruptured in the 2004 event.

Only 58 hours after the earthquake, the much larger magnitude 9.1–9.3 2004 Indian Ocean earthquake occurred. The two events are believed to be unrelated. As a result of the Indian Ocean earthquake, little attention was immediately given into research on the Tasman Sea earthquake. The interfering seismic activity that resulted from the Indian Ocean event and its aftershocks made it difficult to reliably determine the epicentre locations of many of the aftershocks of the Tasman Sea event.

== Impact ==
The earthquake was felt over a large area. In New Zealand, the shaking was prolonged and was strong enough to wake people up from their sleep at the southern end of the South Island, but no damage was reported. In Tasmania, local police received a handful of calls after the earthquake, with reports of shaking houses and swinging light fittings. On the remote Macquarie Island, all 22 people working at Macquarie Island Station reported they slept through the earthquake, only discovering it had happened upon waking up in the morning. There were no reports of damage on the island.

=== Tsunami ===
The earthquake generated a small tsunami, which reached a height of 0.30 m (0.98 ft) in Jackson Bay, New Zealand, 0.15 m (0.49 ft) in Spring Bay, Tasmania, and 0.10 m (0.33 ft) in Port Kembla, New South Wales. There were no eyewitnesses to the tsunami and it caused no damage.

== See also ==
- 1998 Balleny Islands earthquake
- 2009 Dusky Sound earthquake
- 2021 Kermadec Islands earthquakes
- List of earthquakes in New Zealand
- List of earthquakes in Australia
- List of earthquakes in 2004
