= Emerald fracture zone =

Fault zone south of New Zealand near Antarctica

Map of the Emerald fracture zone as red shading to south and relationship to its north to the approximate line of the Macquarie Ridge (yellow) which is the Australian and Pacific plate boundary. Clicking on map enables mouse over, which shows a purple dot as the location of the Macquarie triple junction.

The Emerald fracture zone (62°S 170°E) is an undersea fracture zone running the distance from the southwest corner of the Campbell Plateau to the northern tip of Iselin Bank. The name was proposed by Dr. Steven C. Cande of the Scripps Institution of Oceanography for the vessel Emerald, which traversed this region in 1821, and was approved by the Advisory Committee for Undersea Features in June 1997. The Emerald Basin to its northwest (not to be confused with the other Emerald Basin which lies off of Halifax, Nova Scotia, in the North Atlantic) was named from the same source. Some have restricted the name to the southern east west orientated transform fault zone but the north south orientated faults that define the eastern boundary of the Emerald Basin are generally included in the literature.

== Geology ==
The latest reinterpretation of the ocean floor geology of the region based on magnetic data assigns the area of the fault zone to oceanic crust of Eocene to Miocene age and so would distinguish other north south fault zones in the Cretaceous oceanic crust to the south east of the Campbell Plateau. The fracture zone is related to the Hjort Trench that represents the southern end of the Australian Plate and Pacific Plate convergence, contains the Macquarie Triple Junction at its south western margin and mainly acts as a leaky transform fault zone between the Antarctic Plate and Pacific Plate. It has only moderate current seismic activity. An example was the M_{ww}5.9 event of 9 June 2023.

== Tectonics ==
The clockwise rotation of the Pacific Plate and Antarctic Plate between 12 and 10 million years ago resulted in fragmentation of the long-offset Emerald transform fault and its replacement over less than 2 million years with closely spaced, highly variable transform offsets that were joined by short ridge segments. There was asymmetrical spreading rates in the area of the leaky transform fault zone near the Macquarie Triple Junction.

== See also ==
- Macquarie fault zone
- Macquarie triple junction
