= 1998 Balleny Islands earthquake =

Earthquake off Antarctica in 1998

- Location within Antarctica
- UTC time: 1998-03-25 03:12:25
- ISC event: 1083606
- USGS-ANSS: ComCat
- Local date: 25 March 1998
- Local time: 13:12:25 AEST; 15:12:25 NZST
- Magnitude: 8.1 M_{w}
- Depth: 8.7 km (5 mi)
- Epicenter: 62.877°S 149.527°E
- Type: Strike-slip
- Areas affected: Antarctica
- Total damage: None
- Max. intensity: MMI I (Not felt)
- Aftershocks: Yes
- Casualties: None

In the afternoon of Wednesday 25 March 1998, a very large magnitude 8.1 earthquake struck a remote area of the Southern Ocean. Its epicentre was located roughly 450 km (280 mi) north of George V Land and roughly 700 km (435 mi) northwest of the Balleny Islands in Antarctica. Due to the remote location of the earthquake, there were no reports of anyone feeling any shaking or any damage being caused. The event was a complex intraplate earthquake within the Antarctic plate. To date it is the largest recorded earthquake in Antarctica, and is the largest recorded earthquake to have been caused by post-glacial rebound. The earthquake occurred in an area which previously had very little seismic activity, and so such a large event was unprecedented in the seismic record.

== Tectonic setting ==
Nearby to the Balleny Islands is the Macquarie triple junction, where the Antarctic, Australian, and Pacific Plates meet. This junction lays nearby to the Australia-Pacific pole of rotation, and so stresses are imparted into the interiors of the plates themselves rather than only at the boundaries.

The boundary between the Antarctic and Australian plates is divergent. At divergent boundaries, the spreading ridges are offset from each other and separated by small sections of transform faulting. Fracture zones within the tectonic plates are created as continuations of these transform faults. Two of the fracture zones that extend south from the plate boundary are the Carey Fracture Zone (CFZ) and the Gambier Fracture Zone (GFZ).

Also located in the region is the Antarctic Plate Earthquake Seamount (APES), named after the associated event. Within this seamount, there are a series of east-west-oriented dead normal faults, in addition to two more faults just to the north of the seamount. It is hypothesised that these dead normal faults were created during the initial rifting of the Antarctic and Australian plates.

== Earthquake ==
The earthquake occurred at a shallow depth and had a moment magnitude of 8.1, with its epicentre being located roughly 250 km (155 mi) south of the boundary between the Antarctic and Australian plates. The earthquake ruptured in a sinistral (left-lateral) strike-slip manner, oriented east–west for a length of roughly 200 km (124 mi). The event comprised five separate subevents, which were clustered into two regions. The first three subevents occurred during the first 50 seconds of the rupture, and extended roughly 100 km (62 mi) to the west of the epicentre. The last two subevents occurred during seconds 70 to 90, and ruptured an area roughly 200 km (124 mi) west of the epicentre.

Studies found that the stresses imparted into the interior of the Antarctic plate from the Macquarie triple junction were not consistent with the rupture pattern that was observed. Therefore, the earthquake must have been caused by other processes. It was found that the stresses which would be generated within the Antarctic plate as a result of the deglaciation of the Antarctic ice sheet 5000 years ago were consistent with the rupture pattern that occurred. Therefore, it is hypothesised that these post-glacial stresses ruptured the crust at a pre-existing zone of crustal weakness. It was found that the area which ruptured was the dead normal fault just to the north of the APES, which was reactivated and ruptured in a strike-slip manner upon being imparted with horizontal stresses.

This fault which ruptured lays perpendicular to the fracture zones which extend south from the plate boundary between the Antarctic and Australian plates, and it intersects almost perpendicularly with both the CFZ and the GFZ. These two intersections were found to be the areas of highest stress along the fault which ruptured, and consequently the two subevent clusters which occurred were located nearby to these two intersections.

=== Subsequent events ===
The NEIC reported 68 aftershocks within the 12 months after the earthquake occurred, of which 54 occurred within the first month. The largest aftershock was a magnitude 6.4 which struck 9 hours after the main shock. These aftershocks were also clustered around the intersections between the ruptured fault and the fracture zones, and some even occurred on the fracture zones themselves.

After the Balleny Islands earthquake, the seismicity of a wide area surrounding the epicentre was measurably changed, with an increase in detected earthquakes extending as far as into the Antarctic continent itself. It was not able to be determined if this increased detection was directly the result of the Balleny Islands earthquake, or if it was the result of improved technology.

== See also ==
- List of earthquakes in 1998
- 2004 Tasman Sea earthquake
