= Yerecoin, Western Australia =

Town in the Wheatbelt region of Western Australia

Yerecoin
- Town
- Interactive map of Yerecoin
- Coordinates: 30°55′00″S 116°23′00″E
- Country: Australia
- State: Western Australia
- LGA: Shire of Victoria Plains
- Location: 156 km (97 mi) NNE of Perth; 35 km (22 mi) W of Wongan Hills; 21 km (13 mi) N of Calingiri
- Established: 1920s

Government
  - State electorate: Moore
  - Federal division: Durack

Area
  - Total: 161.2 km^{2} (62.2 sq mi)

Population
  - Total: 67 (SAL 2021)
- Postcode: 6571

Yerecoin is a small town located in the Wheatbelt region of Western Australia, in the Shire of Victoria Plains,156 kilometres (97 mi) north-northeast of the state capital, Perth.

The surrounding areas produce wheat and other cereal crops.The town also has many sheep and/or cattle farmers. The town is a receival site for the CBH Group.

== History ==
Yerecoin was the Aboriginal name for a nearby well, first recorded by a surveyor in 1879. It was first established as a railway station on a new line north from Toodyay, which was approved in 1914 and was extended from Bolgart to Calingiri in 1917 and further to Piawaning (10 km north of Yerecoin) in 1919. The surrounding land was owned by the Midland Railway Company, and was not subdivided by the company until 1925. The company also set aside 200 acres (0.81 km^{2}) for a townsite at Yerecoin, but the land was sold to one owner, and development of the townsite area was slow. A school was opened in 1927, and was followed by other community buildings. The town was gazetted in 1966.

== See also ==
- Earthquakes in Western Australia
- South West Seismic Zone
