= Grevillea stenostachya =

Scientific classification
- Kingdom: Plantae
- Clade: Tracheophytes
- Clade: Angiosperms
- Clade: Eudicots
- Order: Proteales
- Family: Proteaceae
- Genus: Grevillea
- Species: G. stenostachya

Binomial name
- Grevillea stenostachya C.A.Gardner

Species of shrub endemic to Western Australia

Grevillea stenostachya is a species of flowering plant in the family Proteaceae and is endemic to the west of Western Australia. It is a compact shrub with pinnatipartite to almost pinnatisect leaves with 3 to 5 lobes, the end lobes cylindrical and sharply pointed, and greenish-white to creamy yellow flowers with a cream-coloured to yellow style.

== Description ==
Grevillea stenostachya is a compact, densely-branched shrub that typically grows to a height of 0.6–1.5 m (2 ft 0 in – 4 ft 11 in). The leaves are pinnatipartite to almost pinnatisect, 15–50 mm (0.59–1.97 in) long, usually with 3 to 5 lobes, the end lobes cylindrical, 5–20 mm (0.20–0.79 in) long and 0.7–1.5 mm (0.028–0.059 in) wide and sharply pointed. The flowers are usually arranged in clusters with 2 to 5 branches, each branch cylindrical and 25–40 mm (0.98–1.57 in) long. The flowers are greenish-white to creamy yellow with a cream-coloured to yellow style, the pistil 3.8–5.2 mm (0.15–0.20 in) long. Flowering mainly occurs in August and September, and the fruit is a wrinkled, oval follicle 7–8 mm (0.28–0.31 in) long.

== Taxonomy ==
Grevillea stenostachya was first formally described in 1936 by Charles Gardner in the Journal of the Royal Society of Western Australia from specimens he collected with William Blackall east of Meeberrie homestead, near the Murchison River in 1931. The specific epithet (stenostachya) means "narrow flower spike".

== Distribution and habitat ==
This grevillea grows in scub or mallee between Hamelin Pool, Meekatharra and the Murchison River in the Coolgardie, Geraldton Sandplains, Murchison and Yalgoo bioregions in the west of western Western Australia.

== Conservation status ==
Grevillea stenomera is listed as "not threatened" by the Western Australian Government Department of Biodiversity, Conservation and Attractions.

== See also ==
- List of Grevillea species
