= List of earthquakes in Australia =

This is a list of significant earthquakes recorded in Australia and its territories. The currency used is the Australian dollar (A$) unless noted otherwise.

== List of earthquakes ==
State(s)	Location	Date	M	Type	MMI	Deaths	Injuries	Total damage / notes	Source
Victoria	Offshore Cape Schanck	1855-09-17	UK					Minor damage in Melbourne and surroundings.	
Queensland	Gayndah	1883-08-28	5.9					Caused major damage in the Gayndah region.	
Victoria	Cape Liptrap	1885-07-02	5.7					Felt throughout Victoria, including Melbourne and Geelong. Minor damage around epicentre.	
New South Wales/ACT	Yass	1886-11-15	5.5					Damage caused in Yass, felt strongly in Queanbeyan.	
South Australia	Beachport – Robe	1897-05-10	6.5	UK	IX		50		
South Australia	Warooka	1902-09-19	6.0			2		Significant damage to the township of Warooka. 2 deaths caused by heart attacks from the shock.	
Victoria	Warrnambool	1903-07-14	5.3					Damage in Warrnambool	
Victoria	Alpine National Park	1904-04-10	5.0					Felt throughout North East Victoria and Southern New South Wales, but not in Melbourne.	
New South Wales	Newcastle	1906-05-16	UK					Damage in the suburb of The Hill. Ruptured water mains. Caused some cliff erosion	
New South Wales	Taree – Newcastle	1916-06-11	UK					Damage to the Seal Rocks lighthouse. Caused alarm along the Mid-North Coast.	
Queensland	Banana Shire-North Burnett	1918-06-07	6.0	Mwi	VI-VII	-	-	Inland and onshore in the Camboon area. Caused damage to some buildings in Banana and Rockhampton. It was felt from Mackay in the north to Charleville in the west and as far south as Armidale. It was also strongly felt throughout Brisbane Aftershocks continued for almost a year at Camboon and other cattle stations in the area. The flow of springs increased at Cockatoo Station, Miles, and Wainui. Often referred to as the Bundaberg earthquake and previously incorrectly thought to be offshore.	
Victoria	Offshore Ocean Grove	1922-04-10	5.7					Chimney collapse in Glen Iris. Objects thrown from shelves in Cranbourne, Malvern East, Pakenham and Portarlington. Felt as far north as Ivanhoe, as far west as Warrnambool and as far south as Burnie, Tasmania. A magnitude 4.9 earthquake struck a few kilometres east of this earthquake back on the morning of 1 March 1922, which was felt throughout Melbourne, knocking picture frames off a wall in Cowes.	
New South Wales	Newcastle	1925-12-18	5.3					Damage and panic in Hunter Street (particularly at the Theatre Royal).	
Tasmania	North East Tasmania	1929-12-29	5.6					Significant damage in Launceston, Tasmania; felt across Western Tasmania from Burnie to Hobart.	
Victoria	Mornington	1932-09-03	4.5					Felt widely in Melbourne, Geelong, Mornington Peninsula, Westernport Bay and Gippsland. Minor damage. Largest earthquake along the infamous Selwyn Fault since the 5.5 magnitude quake of 1855, which occurred a few kilometres offshore of Cape Schanck.	
New South Wales	Gunning	1934-11-15	5.6					Damaged a majority of the buildings in Gunning. Felt strongly in Canberra.	
Queensland	Gayndah	1935-04-12	5.4					Caused considerable damage to the town of Gayndah. One fatality.	
Western Australia	Meeberrie	1941-04-29	6.3					Severe shaking, burst water tanks and cracked ground at Meeberrie homestead. Minor damage reported in Perth, 500 kilometres (311 mi) away. Formerly rated strongest onshore earthquake recorded in Australia (7.2), it has since been rated at 6.3.	
Victoria / Tasmania	Bass Strait	1946-09-15	6.2					Minor damage reported in Tasmania from Burnie to Huonville, and in Gippsland, Victoria. Offshore earthquake	
New South Wales	Dalton and Gunning	1949-03-10	5.5					Significant damage in Dalton and Gunning; minor cracks in some buildings in Canberra. Felt from Sydney in the north to Narooma and Cooma in the south.	
South Australia	Adelaide	1954-03-01	5.5		VIII			Damage totaling $90 million. Widespread minor damage. Considerable damage to many buildings.	
Western Australia	Gabalong	1955-08-30	5.8					Felt in Perth. Epicentre near Gabalong, about 30 km east of Moora and 200 km NNE of Perth	
Victoria	Cape Otway	1960-12-25	5.3					No major damage reported.	
New South Wales	Robertson and Bowral	1961-05-21	5.5	M_{L}				$3.4 million	
Victoria	Mount Hotham	1966-05-04	5.5					Broken Windows at Mountt Hotham Ski Village. Felt across North-eastern Victoria, Gippsland and South-eastern New South Wales. Not felt in Melbourne.	
Western Australia	Meckering	1968-10-14	6.5	M_{w}	IX		20–28	$2.2 million	
Victoria	Boolarra	1969-06-20	5.3					5.0 aftershock two days later. Cracked walls and stacked chimneys in and around epicentral area. Felt in central and eastern Victoria including Geelong, Benalla and Orbost and on Flinders Island.	
Western Australia	Canning Basin	1970-03-24	6.7					Little damage due to the remoteness of the area. Part of a sequence of c. 25 quakes of magnitude 5.0 or greater in the Canning Basin area of northern Western Australia between 1970 and 1982.	
Victoria	Western Port	1971-07-07	5.0					Minor damage in Cowes, Flinders and Shoreham. Felt throughout Melbourne, Western Port Bay and Gippsland.	
Western Australia	Canning Basin	1971-07-16	6.4					Part of a sequence of c. 25 quakes of magnitude 5.0 or greater in the Canning Basin area of northern Western Australia between 1970 and 1982	
New South Wales	Picton	1973-03-09	5.6					Damage totaling $2.8 million. Minor damage in Picton, Bowral and Wollongong	
Western Australia	Canning Basin	1975-10-03	6.2					Part of a sequence of c. 25 quakes of magnitude 5.0 or greater in the Canning Basin area of northern Western Australia between 1970 and 1982	
Victoria	Balliang	1977-12-02	4.7				1	Felt strongly in Geelong and across the suburbs of Melbourne, caused minor damage in the Anakie area.	
Western Australia	Cadoux	1979-06-02	6.1					25 buildings in Cadoux were damaged. Damage cost $3.8 million. Perth, 180 kilometres (112 mi) away experienced some swaying of tall buildings but no damage was reported. This was one of the largest onshore earthquakes recorded in Australia.	
Victoria	Wonnangatta	1982-11-21	5.4					The epicentre was in the remote Wonnangatta Valley, along the Wonnangatta Fault; it was mostly felt widely in Eastern Victoria and South Eastern New South Wales and throughout Melbourne and its South Eastern suburbs but not in Geelong.	
Northern Territory	Marryat Creek	1986-10-30	5.9					Damage was minor, cracked walls observed in DeRose Hill and Victory Downs stations. Felt in Alice Springs 300 kilometres (186 mi) to the north, and Coober Pedy 350 kilometres (217 mi) to the south.	
Northern Territory	Tennant Creek	1988-01-22	6.7, 6.4, 6.3					Two buildings and 3 other structures damaged, damage caused to natural gas pipeline. Total damage $2.5 million. Three earthquakes of between 6.3 and 6.7 on the Richter scale. Remarkably caused little damage, despite the intensity of the quake. Felt in high-rise buildings as far away as Perth and Adelaide	
Northern Territory	Ayers Rock	1989-05-28	5.7					Minor damage was reported at Yulara resort	
New South Wales	Newcastle	1989-12-28	5.6	M_{L}	VIII	13	160	$4 billion in damage	
New South Wales	Ellalong	1994-08-06	5.3	M_{w}	VII		2	1,000 homes and 50 other buildings damaged. Total damage $36 million.	
Victoria	Mount Baw Baw	1996-09-25	5.0					Thomson Dam region. No major damage	
South Australia	Burra	1997-03-05	5.0					No major damage. Felt over a wide area.	
Western Australia	Collier Bay	1997-08-10	6.3	M_{w}				No major damage. Felt from Broome to Halls Creek and Kununurra. Strongest earthquake recorded in Australia since the 1988 Tennant Creek earthquake.	
New South Wales	Appin	1999-03-17	4.8					65 kilometres (40 mi) southwest of Sydney. Depth only 3.2 km. Felt in Sydney and caused 1000 homes to lose power.	
Victoria	Boolarra	2000-08-29	5.0					Caused minor damage. Felt strongly throughout Gippsland and South Eastern Suburbs of Melbourne.	
Victoria	Swan Hill	2001-10-27	4.8					Felt in Swan Hill near VIC–NSW border, Minor damage including fallen chimneys and fallen shelve items. Power disruptions.	
Tasmania	Macquarie Island	2004-12-24	8.1					Felt in Tasmania	
Western Australia	Kalgoorlie	2010-04-20	5.2	M_{w}	V		2	Buildings damaged	
Victoria	Gippsland	2012-06-19	5.4	M_{L}	V			Minor	
Queensland	Coral Sea	2015-07-30	5.5	M_{w}	V			Slight building damage	
Northern Territory	MacDonnell Region	2016-05-20	6.0	M_{w}	VIII				
Queensland	Bowen-Townsville	2016-08-18	5.8					North Queensland was rocked by 5.8 magnitude earthquake, 124 km southeast of Townsville. The quake struck at 3.31pm, about 130 km south of Townsville, 60 km west of Bowen and 10 km below the earth's surface.	
Victoria/New South Wales/Tasmania/South Australia	Mansfield	2021-09-22	5.9	M_{w}	VII		1	Building and other damage in Melbourne and Eastern Victoria. The main earthquake was followed by aftershocks – a magnitude 3.5 quake at 9:24am, a 4.1 quake at 9:33am, a 2.5 quake at 9:47am and a 3.1 quake at 9:54am.	
Victoria/South Australia/New South Wales	Murrayville	2021-10-08	4.9		V			Felt in Murrayville.	
Western Australia	Marble Bar	2021-11-13	5.3		VI			Moderate shaking felt around the epicentre and nearby areas. Reports of houses abruptly shaking after an initial vibrating noise.	
Western Australia	Arthur River	2022-01-25	4.7/4.8	mb	V			Minor damage to buildings in nearby Wagin. Reports of moderate shaking felt around the epicentre and nearby areas.	
Victoria	Sunbury	2023-05-28	4.0	M_{L}	VI			Moderate shaking felt around the epicentre and nearby areas. Houses were abruptly shaking, residents awoke after an initial vibrating noise. The main earthquake was followed by one aftershock of magnitude 2.6 at 11:43 pm	
Western Australia	Gnowangerup	2023-08-06	5.2	M_{L}	VII			One building destroyed and another damaged in the town of Gnowangerup. Could be felt from as far as Perth	
Victoria	Apollo Bay	2023-10-22	5.0	M_{L}	VI			Moderate shaking felt around the epicentre and as far as Melbourne. Some buildings in nearby areas and Geelong suffered damage. An aftershock of magnitude 3.5 occurred at 5:44 am.	
New South Wales	11 km south of Bullaburra	2024-03-08 8:53pm	3.5	MLa		0	0	Almost 5900 felt reports from Newcastle, out to Bathurst and as far South as Albion Park. The majority was felt in the Sydney basin and the Blue Mountains.	
Queensland	Epicenter in Kilkivan	2025-08-16	5.6	M_{w}	V			Recorded at 9:49am AEST	
Victoria	Arawata	2026-10-03	4.8		V			Epicentre near Arawata in the South Gippsland region, approximately 130 km southeast of Melbourne. Shaking was felt widely across Melbourne, Geelong, and surrounding areas, waking many residents. Over 15,000 felt reports were submitted to Geoscience Australia. No major damage or injuries were reported.	
The inclusion criteria for adding events are based on WikiProject Earthquakes' notability guideline that was developed for stand alone articles. The principles described are also applicable to lists. In summary, only damaging, injurious, or deadly events should be recorded. M_{w} = moment magnitude scale | M_{s} = surface-wave magnitude | M_{L} = Richter scale | UK = Unknown

== Other earthquakes ==
- Broome, 16 August 1929, magnitude 6.6, offshore earthquake to the north-west of Broome, Western Australia.
- Simpson Desert, 21 December 1937, magnitude 6.0, in a remote location of the Simpson Desert in the Northern Territory, south-east of Alice Springs.
- Simpson Desert, 27 June 1941, magnitude 6.5, in a remote location of the Simpson Desert in the Northern Territory, south-east of Alice Springs.
- Broome, 14 July 2019, magnitude 6.6, offshore earthquake 200 km north-west of Broome, Western Australia, which caused minor damage in the town itself

== See also ==
- Earthquakes in Western Australia
- Geology of Australia
