= 1961 New South Wales earthquake =

Earthquake in Australia

- Location within New South Wales
- UTC time: 1961-05-21 21:40
- ISC event: 876612
- USGS-ANSS: n/a
- Local date: 22 May 1961
- Local time: 07:40 AEST
- Magnitude: 5.5 M_{L}
- Epicenter: 34°36′S 150°.24′E
- Areas affected: Australia
- Total damage: AU$3.4 million (1990 value)
- Casualties: None

The 1961 New South Wales earthquake (also called the Robertson earthquake) occurred on 22 May in the Australian state of New South Wales (NSW). It reached a Richter magnitude of 5.5 and caused significant structural damage in a wide area.

The earthquake was felt from the Snowy Mountains region in the southeast of the state to Newcastle on the coast about 75 miles (120 km) north of Sydney; to Dubbo in central eastern NSW about 180 miles (290 km) northwest of Sydney; and to Narrandera in the state's central south about 210 miles (340 km) southwest of Dubbo – an estimated area of 50,000 square miles (129,500 km^{2}). In the area of Moss Vale, Robertson, and Bowral about 70 miles (110 km) southwest of Sydney, the earthquake caused significant structural damage to buildings, while rockfalls blocked the nearby Macquarie Pass. Sydney suffered minimal damage from the earthquake itself, though the tremors and resulting power failures caused "considerable alarm".

Seismograms at the Sydney suburb of Riverview were used to estimate the magnitude of the earthquake. There were only three known earthquakes of comparable magnitude prior to this one, occurring in 1930, 1934 and 1938.

== See also ==
- List of earthquakes in 1961
- List of earthquakes in Australia
