= Puysegur Trench =

Deep cleft in the floor of the Tasman Sea

Coordinates: 48.334°S 164.167°E

The Puysegur Trench and Macquarie Ridge are marked by the line extending south from the southwestern South Island.

The 6,300-metre-deep (20,700-foot) Puysegur Trench is a deep cleft in the floor of the south Tasman Sea formed by the subduction of the Indo-Australian Plate under the Pacific Plate to the south of New Zealand. Immediately to its east lies the Puysegur Ridge, a northern extension of the Macquarie Ridge, which separates the Puysegur Trench from the Solander Trough. To the west is the expanse of the Tasman Basin, which stretches most of the distance to Australia. To the north of the trench lies the Fiordland Basin, which can be considered an extension of the trench. The Puysegur Trench mirrors the Kermadec Trench and Tonga Trench north of New Zealand.

Map of Puysegur Trench (blue) and its active ocean floor tectonic relationships. The immediate adjacent to the south McDougall Fault Zone (red shading) and approximate Macquarie Ridge line (yellow) are shown. The arc Solander volcanic edifice (brown) and the Resolution Ridge (black line) are shown. The Macquarie Ridge associated basins (northwest portion of South East Tasman Basin, Solander Trough & Emerald Basin) are shown in light purple shading as this delimits most of the historic cross faulting and other fault zones closely related to the historic sea floor spreading centre of the Macquarie Ridge (click on map to enable mouse over, a purple dot shown then is the location of the Macquarie Triple Junction far to the south).

The Puysegur Trench stretches for over 800 kilometres south from the southwesternmost point of the South Island's coast, its southernmost extent being 400 kilometres due west of the Auckland Islands. It is named after Puysegur Point.

== Tectonic relationships ==
The Australian Plate is subducting under the Pacific Plate at a rate of 36 mm (1.4 in)/year at the Puysegur Trench. The northern end of the trench rises to meet the Resolution Ridge off the south western tip of New Zealand's Fiordland and the Alpine Fault continues north as the plate boundary. The southern part of the trench is adjacent to the Puysegur Ridge to its west which contains the Puysegur Fault. North of the Puysegur Ridge and Fault there multiple faults in the Snares Zone which transit south of the South Island to named faults such as the Hauroko Fault, Solander Fault, and Parara Fault. The Puysegur Ridge becomes the Puysegur Bank north of the Snares Zone and south of Fiordland.

=== Earthquakes ===
The area around the Puysegur Trench is highly seismically active, with the Alpine Fault starting at the trench's northern end. In July 2009, New Zealand's third-largest recorded earthquake (magnitude 7.8) struck close to the northern end of the trench off the coast of Fiordland. There have also been recent large earthquakes there in 2003 and 2004. Models have shown that the southern portion of the trench is capable of rupturing in a magnitude 8.5–8.6 earthquake. An 8.7 magnitude earthquake in the trench would create a tsunami as high as 7 metres in South Island's coasts according to a research in October 2011.

=== Arc Volcanism ===
As the subduction is south east to north west, the associated arc volcanism, which may be relatively recent in last known of manifestation at 50,000 years ago, is in the Solander Islands, which are visible from the coast of the Southland, New Zealand.
