= South West seismic zone =

Intraplate earthquake province in Western Australia

The South West seismic zone (also identified as SWSZ) is a major intraplate earthquake province located in the south west of Western Australia.

It was known earlier as the Yandanooka–Cape Riche Lineament, including the physiographic boundary known as the Meckering Line, and also the junction between Swanland and Salinaland.

The zone exists within an Archaean Shield structure called the Yilgarn Block. The identified geological subdivisions within this Precambrian structure do not show an obvious relation to the seismicity.

The zone represents a significant seismic hazard to Perth. More than six thousand earthquakes have occurred in the SWSZ in the years 1968–2002. Meckering, Cadoux and Burakin earthquakes originated in the SWSZ. More recent events have occurred to the south in Lake Muir in 2018 and Arthur River in 2022.

The zone and the explanation of it, has been titled Perthquake in the Catalyst programme on the ABC in 2001.

Temporal variation of the events in the region have been analysed over time. In the 2000s, monitoring and instrumentation was developed in the region.

== See also ==
- Earthquakes in Western Australia
