= 2012 Gippsland earthquake =

Earthquake in Australia

- Location within Victoria Location within Australia
- UTC time: 2012-06-19 10:53:29
- ISC event: 604029463
- USGS-ANSS: ComCat
- Local date: 19 June 2012
- Local time: 20:53:29 AEST
- Magnitude: 5.2 M_{w}^{(USGS)} 4.9 M_{L}
- Depth: 10.0 km (6.2 mi)
- Epicenter: 38.304°S 146.200°E
- Areas affected: Australia
- Max. intensity: MMI VII (Very strong)
- Aftershocks: >60
- Casualties: 0

A magnitude 5.2 earthquake struck Gippsland near Moe at 8.55 pm on 19 June 2012, at a shallow depth of 10.0 km. It was the strongest recorded in Victoria in at least three decades, with some sources suggesting it was the strongest in over a century. It was felt across much of Victoria and parts of New South Wales, with strong shaking reported across the state capital, Melbourne. Some minor building damage was reported in the Latrobe Valley close to the epicentre, and in the eastern suburbs of Melbourne. Around 30 requests for help were made to the SES, mainly due to cracked walls and ceilings, and a number of local businesses lost some stock. Power outages occurred in some homes, but no significant reports of gas leaks were reported. Approximately 60 aftershocks were recorded the following day, but most of these were not felt.

A magnitude 4.3 M_{w} aftershock occurred in the same area at 7.11 pm on 20 July 2012 at a similar depth. This tremor was felt across south Gippsland, as well as Melbourne and the Mornington Peninsula. This aftershock was the strongest of over 200 that occurred since the initial quake.

== See also ==
- List of earthquakes in 2012
- List of earthquakes in Australia
