= South West, Western Australia =

The official South West region is a relatively small area

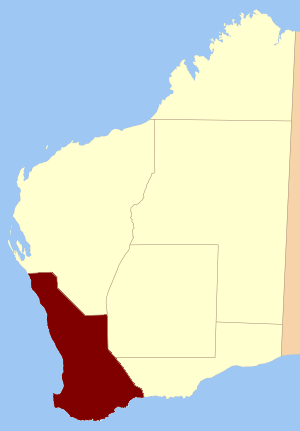
The official South West Land Division

Names such as the South West or South West corner, when used to refer to a specific area of Western Australia, denote a region that has been defined in several different ways.

Such names now usually refer to areas immediately south of the Perth metropolitan region and west of the Wheatbelt. Its narrowest and most specific usage is in reference to the official, government-designated South West region. However, broader usages may include the entire south-western quarter of Australia.

In regard to Western Australia, "South West" may refer to:

- South West Region (Western Australia) – a multi-member electorate of the Western Australian Legislative Council
- South West (Western Australia) - governmental division of local government areas
- Southwest Australia – a botanical and freshwater region and biodiversity hotspot
- South West drainage division – a drainage region
- South West Land Division – a cadastral (land administration) region
- South West Seismic Zone – a seismic region

== See also ==
- Noongar - indigenous people from the south west of Western Australia
- Regions of Western Australia
