= 2010 Kalgoorlie–Boulder earthquake =

Earthquake in western Australia

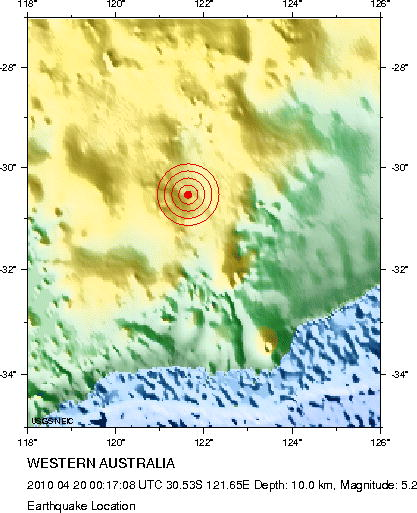

- Location within Australia
- UTC time: 2010-04-20 00:17:08
- ISC event: 14589062
- USGS-ANSS: ComCat
- Local date: 20 April 2010
- Local time: 08:17:08 WST
- Magnitude: 5.2 M_{w}
- Depth: 10 km (6.2 mi)
- Epicenter: 30.530°S 121.653°E
- Areas affected: Australia
- Max. intensity: MMI VI (Strong)
- Casualties: 2 minor injuries

The 2010 Kalgoorlie–Boulder earthquake was a 5.2 M_{w} earthquake that occurred near the city of Kalgoorlie–Boulder, Western Australia on 20 April 2010, at approximately 8:17 am WST.

The earthquake caused major damage to the historic buildings in Kalgoorlie–Boulder. Its epicenter was approximately 10 km (6.2 mi) southwest of Kalgoorlie, at a depth of 10 km (6.2 mi). The duration of shaking lasted about 10–15 seconds and was felt up to 1,007 km (626 mi) away. It was also the largest recorded in the Goldfields region in terms of magnitude and one of the largest in Australia in terms of resulting damage. No one was killed but two people were treated at Kalgoorlie Hospital for minor injuries resulting from the earthquake. It resulted in the temporary closure of local gold mines including the Super Pit gold mine.

== See also ==
- Earthquakes in Western Australia
- List of earthquakes in 2010
- List of earthquakes in Australia
