= Campbell Plateau =

Large oceanic plateau south of New Zealand

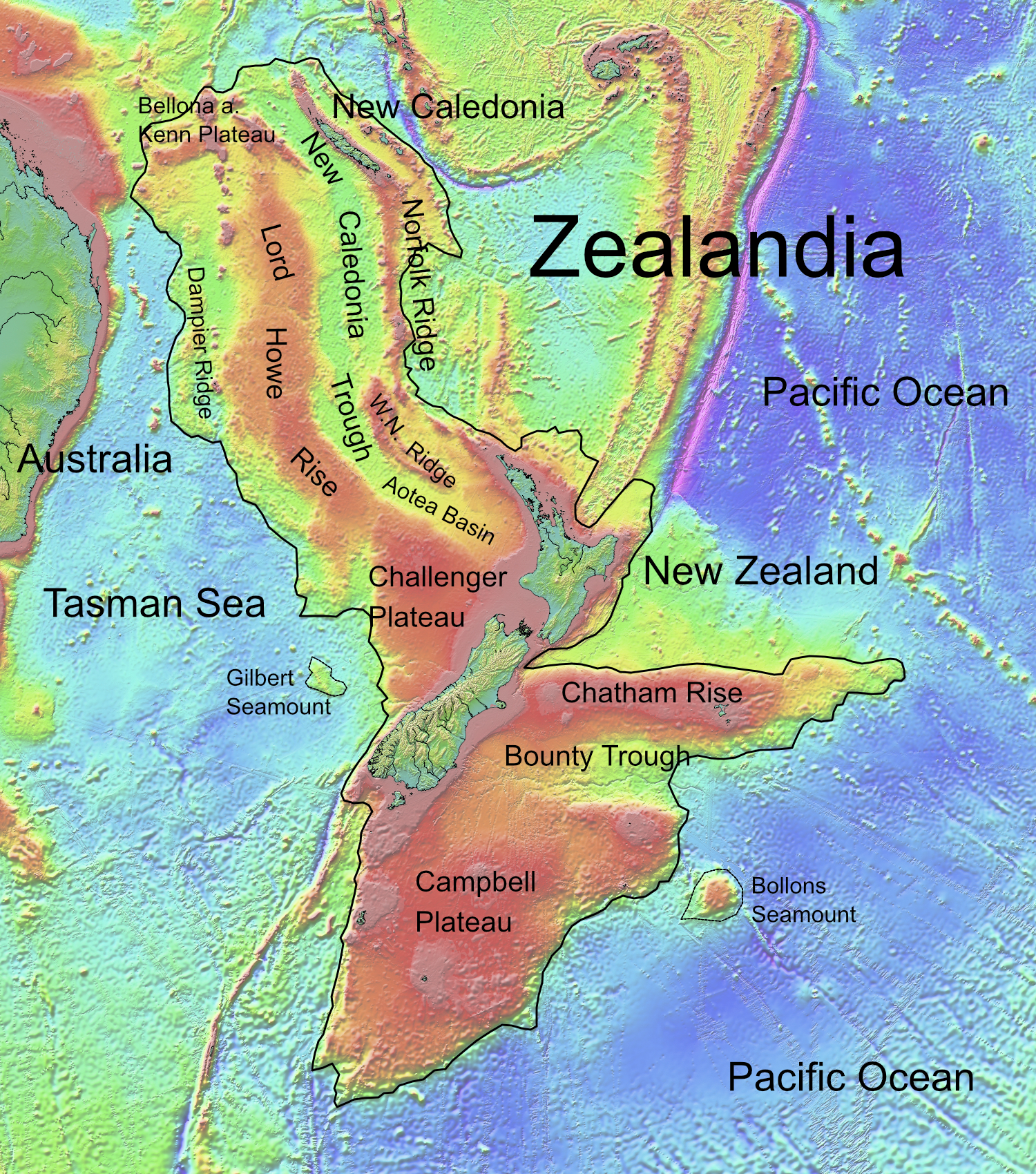
Topographic map of Zealandia showing the Campbell Plateau

The Campbell Plateau is a large oceanic plateau south of New Zealand and the Chatham Rise. It originated in the Gondwanan breakup and is part of Zealandia, a largely submerged continent. The above sea level parts of the plateau — the Bounty Islands, Antipodes Islands, Auckland Islands and Campbell Island — form part of the New Zealand Subantarctic Islands which were declared a World Heritage Site in 1998. Large parts of the Campbell Plateau lie less than 1000 m below sea level. It rises to 500 m at the Pukaki Rise and emerges above sea level at the Auckland and Campbell Islands.

Covering an area of 800,000 km^{2} (310,000 sq mi), the Campbell Plateau has a gently undulating bathymetry with major rises trending east–west: Campbell Island Rise, Pukaki Rise, and Bounty Island Ridge. There are two near-parallel rises on the western margin: Stewart Island–Snare Island Rise and Auckland Island platform. The continental slopes are steep on western and southern margins while the northern margin slowly falls into the Bounty Trough.

== Geology ==
The Campbell Plateau is a roughly triangular, cratonic microcontinent which formed during the break-up of Gondwana around 80 Ma. Large parts of the plateau are made of Palaeozoic or older granites overlain by much younger shield volcanoes who form the Auckland and Campbell Islands.

The Campbell Plateau is made of continental crust, but, as such, is unusually thin. The reason for this is debated, but there are two likely candidates: either an Early Cretaceous extensional event or the Late Cretaceous break-up between New Zealand and Antarctica. Cretaceous extension between the South Island and the Campbell Plateau created the Great South Basin in which 8 km of sediments have since accumulated. The Bounty Trough was created during the same process. The Campbell Plateau can have been affected by this extension or an earlier event.

The islands are composed of continental rocks. The western islands, Auckland, Snares, and Stewart, have a 100–120 Ma-old Middle Cretaceous basement made of granites. On Snares and Stewart islands schists of similar age suggest metamorphism ceased about this time. The basement of Campbell Island and Fiordland are both made of Palaeozoic schists. Bounty Islands are made of 189 Ma-old granodiorite and Precambrian-Cambrian greywackes have been dredge near the island. The Antipodes Islands, in contrast, are composed of Quaternary alkaline olivine basalts.

Most plate-tectonic reconstructions place the Campbell Plateau together with the Lord Howe Rise, the Challenger Plateau, and the Ross Sea before the break-up of Gondwana. These four structures have similar crustal thickness and underwent the same pre-break-up process of crustal thinning and underplating during the Early Cretaceous or Jurassic. The southern margin of the plateau was located next to the continental shelves of the eastern Ross Sea and Marie Byrd Land.

There are two systems of magnetic anomalies on the Campbell Plateau: the Stokes Magnetic Anomaly System (SMAS) and the Campbell Magnetic Anomaly System (CMAS). The origin and relationship of these anomalies remain unclear.

=== Biogeology ===
The islands are important breeding centres for both endemic and circumpolar species, including the royal albatross, crested penguin, and Hooker's sea lion.

The southern part of South Island (Fiordland, Southland and Otago) can be considered part of the Campbell Plateau, both biologically and geologically. Endemic taxa include the spider genus Gohia, the amphipod species Puhuruhuru patersoni, and nine genera of beetles. The order Lepidoptera (moths and butterflies) also link the southern South Island to the New Zealand Subantarctic Islands.

Macquarie Island is biologically but not geologically related to the Campbell Plateau. The island is made of oceanic crust that formed at the Macquarie triple junction. This triple junction was originally located adjacent to the Campbell Plateau but is now isolated south of it due to sea floor spreading. The plateau and the island share several endemic taxa, including six beetle species, a fly genus (Schoenophilus) and a vascular plant genus (Pleurophyllum). Further support for this connection comes from the aralia genus Stilbocarpa and possibly the cormorant.

== Oceanography ==
South of the Campbell Plateau, the eastward-flowing Antarctic Circumpolar Current (ACC) is bounded by the Antarctic Polar Front (APF) and the Subantarctic Front (SAF). It reaches New Zealand with an average volume of c. 130×10^{6} m^{3}/s. South of New Zealand it is partly deflected in the Tasman Sea as a broad, weak flow. The main part of the ACC, however, passes around the Macquarie Ridge together with the SAF and then flows north along the eastern margin of the Campbell Plateau. At 55°S and 50°S the ACC turns eastward again. There is, however, a wind-driven Ekman transport of surface water across the Campbell Plateau. At the Subtropical Convergence the Southland Current rounds the South Island and flows north-east along the island's east coast. From there it entrains Subantarctic and subtropical waters across the north-western Campbell Plateau before branching over the Chatman Rise north of the plateau.
