= Hjort Trench =

Ocean trench south of New Zealand

Coordinates: 58°30′S 157°45′E

Hjort Trench (Oceania)
Map of Hjort Trench (blue). The Emerald fracture zone mentioned in the text to its south east is shown as red shading and to the north is a section of the Macquarie Fault Zone (red). Clicking on map enables mouse over, which shows a purple dot as the location of the Macquarie triple junction where three plate boundaries (white) intersect.

The Hjort Trench is a linear topographic depression south of Macquarie Island in the southwest Pacific Ocean. Geologically, the depression is considered to be the seafloor expression of an ocean-ocean subduction zone, where the Australian plate is thrusting beneath the Pacific plate. As the southernmost portion of the Macquarie Ridge complex, the Hjort Trench lies in an area of diagonal convergence produced by the transform fault evolution of the Emerald fracture zone. Frequent seismic events, most less than 20 km (12 mi) deep, characterize the transpression along this plate boundary.

The trench is named in honour of the Norwegian oceanographer Johan Hjort.

== Geomorphology ==
The deepest point of Hjort Trench is approximately 6.3 km (3.9 mi) below sea level. To the east, the Hjort ridge follows the general curve of the trench, separating the trench from the Hjort Plateau. The trench and ridge are the southern part of the Macquarie Fault Zone which is formed from oceanic crust.

== Incipient subduction ==
The Hjort Trench lies in an area of transpression where the plate boundary transitions from a transform boundary to a convergent one. This is known as earthquake focal mechanisms are both thrust and dextral strike-slip types as found in such areas. As such, this region provides an example of how a transform boundary with a vertical or near-vertical transform fault becomes an area of under-thrusting. Subduction, that is described as atypical, as lighter oceanic crust generated from the Southeast Indian Ridge is subducted under heavier oceanic crust from the extinct spreading center of the Australia-Pacific plate, appears to have commenced.

== See also ==
- Macquarie Fault Zone
- Macquarie triple junction
- Oceanic trench
