= Earthquakes in Western Australia =

Seismological events in Western Australia

Earthquakes have occurred in Western Australia (WA) on a regular basis throughout its geological history.

In 1849, the first earthquake following European settlement in WA was recorded. "On Saturday last, about a quarter past four o'clock a.m., several inhabitants of Perth were awoke by what they conceived to be a slight shock of an earthquake."

The largest earthquake affecting Western Australia in modern times was an offshore earthquake in 2019, occurring 202 km west of Broome at a magnitude of 6.6 causing minor damage in the town itself. The strongest earthquake with its epicentre on land is the magnitude 6.5 Meckering earthquake of 1968, which caused injuries to at least 17 people and extensive property damage; it was the best-known earthquake in Western Australia the late twentieth century. The previous largest earthquake documented occurred in 1941, at Meeberrie, in the Murchison region. Like many earthquakes it remained little known, due to its lack of impact on urban areas. Initially reported at magnitude 7.2–7.3 it was eventually revised down to 6.3 by Geoscience Australia in 2016. The Meckering quake was also revised down from 6.9 to 6.5 in the same year but in the process overtook the Meeberrie quake in strength.

== Recording ==
Prior to scientific equipment being utilised to record earthquakes, newspaper reports appear to be the main source of historical information. Perth Observatory was the recording location from 1923 to 1959, when the Mundaring Geophysical Observatory was operated by the Bureau of Mineral Resources between March 1959 and April 2000. Subsequent to the closing of the Mundaring observatory, recording locations are more dispersed throughout the state.

== Significant earthquakes ==
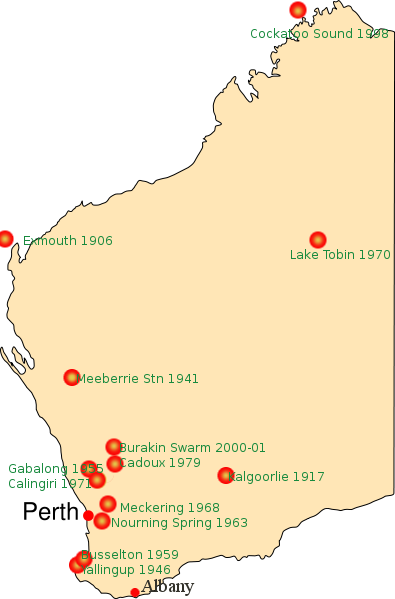
Locations of significant earthquakes

Western Australia's largest recorded onshore earthquake to date was at the Wheatbelt township of Meckering, in October 1968. See the separate section below. The Cadoux earthquake of 1979 with magnitude 6.1 caused surface rupturing, about 15 km (9.3 mi) long.

The Meckering, Calingiri (several during 1970 and 1971) and Cadoux earthquakes led to the identification of a zone of seismicity known as the South West seismic zone. This zone has now been significantly mapped and analysed and is the most active zone in Western Australia.

=== Exmouth 1906 ===
The earthquake which occurred in 1906 about 400 km (250 mi) NW of Exmouth occurred before world earthquake monitoring had really developed. With an estimated magnitude of 7.5, it is probably the largest earthquake known to have occurred in the Australian region.

=== Kalgoorlie 1917 ===
On 28 August 1917, tremor was reported near midnight in Kalgoorlie, which resulted in an underground rock fall, killing one miner and injuring several others. Also in the 1990s further seismic activity required consideration of seismic activity.

=== Meeberrie Station 1941 ===
The second largest onshore earthquake to date in Western Australia was on 29 April 1941 at Meeberrie station at 01.35.39 am (Lat −26.90 and Long 115.80). It was initially reported with a magnitude of 7.3 (though some sources give 7.2) but was revised to 6.3 in 2016.

The Meeberrie earthquake was one of the largest to have occurred in Australia. Its Richter magnitude was 7.2 and it was felt over a wide area of Western Australia. Damage from the earthquake was small because of the low population in the epicentral region, but the shaking at Meeberrie homestead was very severe. All the walls of the homestead were cracked, several rainwater tanks burst, & widespread cracking of the ground occurred. Although questionnaires were distributed by the WA Government Astronomer, there has been scant updated information received on known damage.

=== Yallingup 1946 ===
On 20 April 1946 a magnitude 5.7 earthquake occurred near Yallingup at 9:13 pm on 19 April 1946 (5:13 local time on 20 April), which was felt at Kirup. A tremor was reported at 5:30 am at Caves House Yallingup and at Busselton on 30 April, which is probably the same event, reported on the wrong date.

=== Gabalong 1955 ===
Gabalong, 30 August 1955, magnitude 5.8 Gabalong, a small community about 30 km (19 mi) east of Moora and 200 km (120 mi) NNE of Perth. The earthquake, at 9:52 pm local time, was felt at MM VI at Yericoin and Miling, and MM V in Moora. It was felt in Perth at intensities between MM II and MM IV, and at Dongara at MM II. It was preceded by a magnitude 5.3 earthquake at the same location at 2:09 pm on the same day. It was a SouthWest Seismic Zone earthquake, and because of the poor location capabilities at the time, may well be related to a series of earthquakes near Yericoin, which started with a magnitude 5.1 earthquake on 2 May 1949.

=== Busselton 1959 ===
A magnitude 5.0 earthquake occurred at 12:07 GMT on 3 October (8:07 pm local time) at 34.5 degrees south, 114.5 degrees east. It was felt at Busselton, Yallingup, Margaret River, Bunbury, Cape Naturaliste and Cape Leeuwin.

=== Near Brookton 1963 ===
18 January 1963 at Nourning Spring, approximately 20 km (12 mi) NE of Brookton and approximately 100 km (62 mi) ESE of Perth. It was felt at Intensity VII at Nourning Springs, VI at Brookton, and MM II at Perth. It occurred at 1:49 pm local time, and had a magnitude of 5.4, although it was given a magnitude of 4.9 originally. Many earthquake questionnaires were distributed for this event, and a good isoseismal map was prepared.

=== Meckering 1968 ===
On 14 October 1968 at 10:59 am, an earthquake registering 6.9 on the Richter scale occurred 100 km (62 mi) east of Perth in Meckering, Western Australia. Injuring 20 people, causing over 2 million dollars in damage and felt in towns 650 km (400 mi) away, it is Western Australia's most destructive earthquake to date.

The hypocentre occurred 7 km (4.3 mi) below the earth's surface in the Yandanooka/Cape Riche Lineamen region located east of Meckering. The fault trended on a 32 km (20 mi) north-south arc. Through strike-slip the eastern side of the arc shoved 2 m (6 ft 7 in) westward, 1.5 m (4 ft 11 in) upwards and 0.9 m (2 ft 11 in) in a southerly direction which left a distinct trench in its path. This intraplate earthquake is thought to be caused through east–west compressional force within the southwest seismic zone.

=== Lake Tobin 1970 ===
24 March 1970, magnitude 6.7 near Lake Tobin in the Canning Basin, was the first in a location which had many more earthquakes over the following years. In all, there were three earthquakes of magnitude 6.0 or more (24 March 1970, M 6.7, 16 July 1971, M6.4 and 3/10/75, M 6.2), and 25 earthquakes of magnitude 5.0 or more, the last of which occurred on 13 February 1982.

=== Calingiri 1970 & 1971 ===
An earthquake struck the Wheatbelt town of Calingiri on 10 March 1970 with a magnitude of 5.9. No buildings were damaged despite the epicentre being 3 km (1.9 mi) from the town and the surface being uplifted as much as 30 cm (12 in).

=== Cadoux 1979 ===
On 2 June 1979 the second-most damaging earthquake in Western Australia's recorded history hit with a magnitude of 6.1. The epicentre was close to the town of Cadoux in the Wheatbelt region about 165 km (103 mi) north east of Perth, Western Australia. One person was injured and 25 buildings were damaged along with roads, railways and power-lines over an area of 4 ha (9.9 acres). The total amount of damage was around A$3.8 million.

=== Collier Bay 1997 ===
This earthquake, 10 August 1997, magnitude 6.3 just off the WA north coast in Collier Bay, was the largest Australian earthquake since the magnitude 6.7 earthquake near Tennant Creek, in the Northern Territory, in January 1988.

=== Burakin swarm 2000–01 ===
Located near Cadoux (but not on the same physical feature) the Burakin event was named the most significant seismic activity in 40 years.

=== South of Albany 2001 ===
This very large earthquake on 12 December 2001, magnitude 7.1 occurred about 1,000 km (620 mi) southeast of Albany. It was felt in Albany. It was an intraplate earthquake, as it occurred about 1,000 km (620 mi) north of the (constructive) boundary between the Indo-Australian and Antarctic plates.

=== Kalgoorlie 2010 ===
On 20 April 2010, a magnitude 5.0 earthquake occurred close to Kalgoorlie. The quake caused damage to a number of hotels along Burt street in Boulder and an underpass also on Burt street collapsed. Work in the Superpit and many other mines around Kalgoorlie was also stopped.

=== Lake Muir 2018 ===
On 16 September 2018 a magnitude 5.7 earthquake occurred with its epicentre close to Lake Muir in the South West region. On 13 October another earthquake with a magnitude of 4.7 was recorded followed by a magnitude 5.4 earthquake on 9 November.

=== West of Broome 2019 ===
A magnitude 6.6 earthquake struck just over 200 km west-southwest of Broome during the afternoon of the 14 July 2019 at a depth of 10 km. While it is tied for largest earthquake in Australian waters and was felt widely across northern Western Australia the isolation of the quake meant only superficial damage was reported in Broome

=== Marble Bar 2021 ===
On 13 November 2021 a magnitude 5.4 earthquake stuck east of Marble Bar in the evening. The earthquake was 7.3 km deep and was widely felt across the Eastern Pilbara including in Newman, Port Hedland and various mining projects in the area.

=== Arthur River swarm 2022 ===
The region between Darkan and Wagin, centred on the hamlet of Arthur River reported over 40 earthquakes since the first event on 5 January 2022, with the strongest a magnitude 4.7 on 25 January. It was reported as far away as Busselton and Albany with minor damage reported in Wagin.

=== Gnowangerup 2023 ===
A magnitude 5.2 earthquake struck close to the town of Gnowangerup on 5 August 2023 during the morning. One building was destroyed with another severely damaged. The earthquake could be felt from as far away as Perth.

=== Wyalkatchem 2025 ===
Just after 2:00 am on the 30 July 2025 a shallow magnitude 4.8 earthquake struck 30 km southeast of Wyalkatchem. The quake caused minimal damage but was felt by residents in a wide area between Perth and Kalgoorlie.

== See also ==
- List of earthquakes in Australia
