= Macquarie fault zone =

Lateral-moving transform fault south of New Zealand

- Macquarie Ridge complex, Macquarie Ridge, Macquarie Balleny Ridge, Macquarie Fault (Note: The name "Macquarie Ridge" became its gazetted undersea feature name, but "Macquarie Ridge Complex" is more often used in recent academic literature and this in turn usually now uses the term "Macquarie Fault Zone" for the area limited to the faults around Macquarie Island. The original term for the entire zone appears to have been "Macquarie Ridge" since at least 1965 (Bodie & Dawson 1965) with at least one attempt at new naming to "Macquarie Balleny Ridge" (Colin Summerhayes 1974). The choice of the name "McDougall" for a portion of the fault zone could result in confusion as there are several McDougall faults on land in Canada (TN Setterfield et al. 1995, SM Zubowski 2011), but there is only one gazetted McDougall Trough as an undersea feature.)
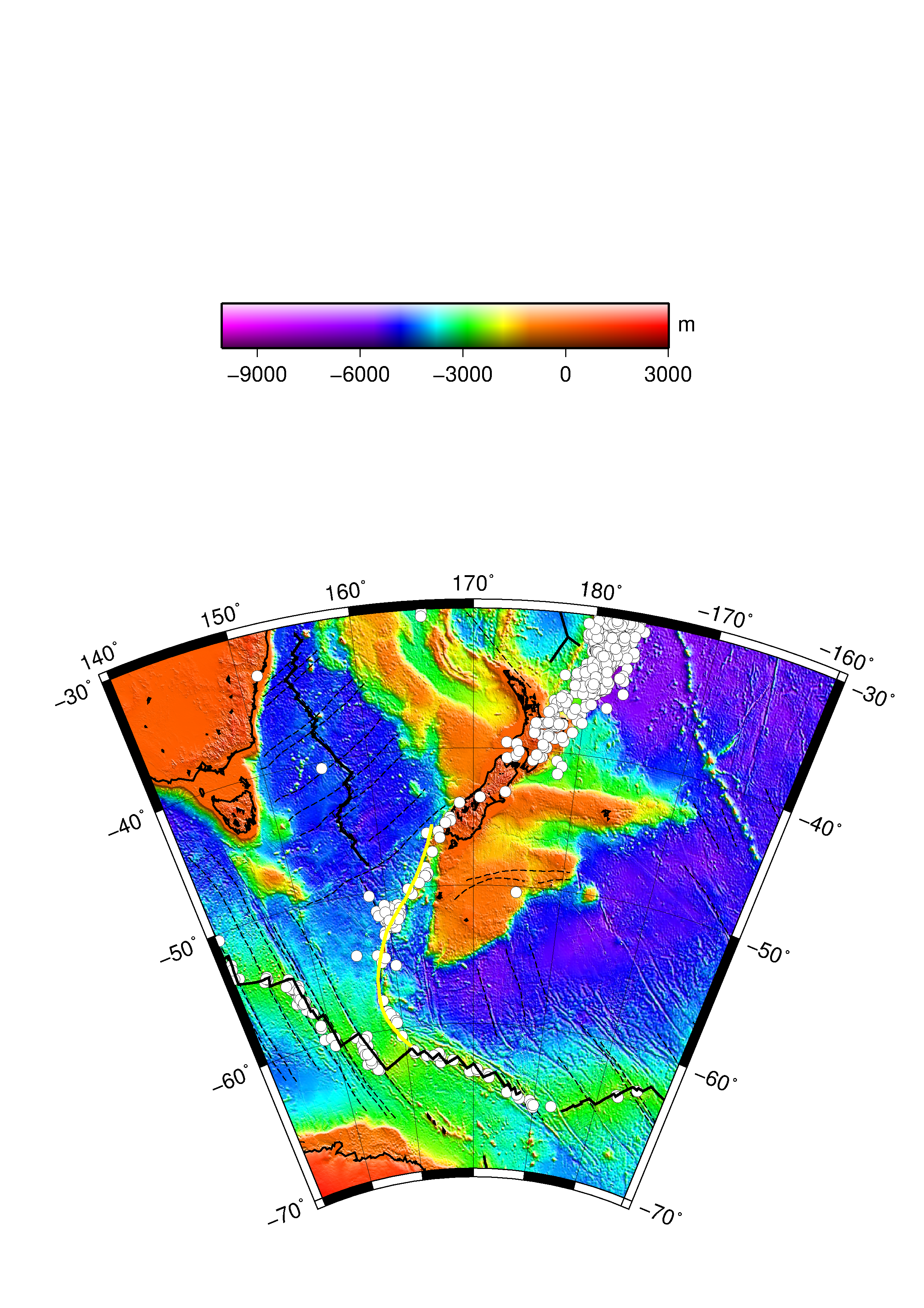
- Macquarie Fault Zone (yellow line) with earthquake epicenters (white circles)
- Map of approximate Macquarie Ridge line (yellow) and its main fault zones mentioned in text (red shading) to show position relative to Puysegur Trench to north and Hjort Trench to the south (blue shading). The Resolution Ridge is shown by a black line and Jurru Fault Zone by red lines although there are other fault zones. (Note: There has been at least one M_{w} 7 earthquake whose epicentre is in the line of the Jurru Fault Zone (Frohlic et al. 1997) and at least 7 other events are in the Jurru Fault Zone, one beyond half way to the Resolution Ridge, so well out into the Tasman Sea floor (Kennett et al 2014).) The Macquarie Ridge associated basins (northwest portion of South East Tasman Basin, Solander Trough & Emerald Basin) are shown in light purple shading as this delimits most of the historic cross faulting and other fault zones closely related to this historic sea floor spreading centre, only some of which have had secondary activation so as to contribute to current seismic activity. (click on map to enable mouse over, a purple dot shown then is the location of the Macquarie triple junction.)
- Etymology: Macquarie Island
- Coordinates: 53°S 160°E

Characteristics
- Elevation: 433 m (1,421 ft)
- Length: 1,600 kilometres (990 mi)

Tectonics
- Plate: Australian plate and Pacific plate boundary
- Earthquakes: Two great (> M_{w} 8) earthquakes in 1989 and 2004 respectively
- Type: Oceanic Crust
- Age: 40–0 Ma

The 1,600-kilometre-long (990 mi) Macquarie fault zone (also known as the Macquarie Ridge, its gazetted name since 2015, the Macquarie Ridge complex or historically as the Macquarie Fault) is a major right lateral-moving transform fault along the seafloor of the south Pacific Ocean which runs from New Zealand southwestward towards the Macquarie triple junction. It is also the tectonic plate boundary between the Australian plate to the northwest and the Pacific plate to the southeast. As such it is a region of high seismic activity and recorded the largest strike-slip event on record up to 23 May 1989, of at least M_{w} 8.0

== Geography ==
The Macquarie fault zone extends south of New Zealand on the South Pacific Ocean's seafloor except where it surfaces as Macquarie Island. Some of it is on Tasman Sea sea floor, north of the line between the south of the Auckland Islands and Tasmania. To its west on the sea floor is the South East Tasman Basin and to its east the Solander Trough and Emerald Basin. Technically the plate boundary becomes part of the Emerald fracture zone to the south of the Hjort Trench, so the zone does not quite reach the Macquarie triple junction.

== Geology ==
The Macquarie fault zone term is also used often now to refer to a major central part of the plate convergent structures south of New Zealand that has become to be termed the Macquarie Ridge complex as the geology has been better characterised. The northern part of this complex is an extension of New Zealand's Alpine Fault which becomes the Puysegur Trench and ridge to its east. New Zealand is continental crust and the northern parts of the complex are associated with oceanic crust subducting under the continental crust of Zealandia. This north Macquarie Ridge Complex has to its west the Resolution Ridge which separates the oceanic crust of the north and south Tasman basins and defines the western margin of the Macqurie Block. The southern part of the Macquarie Ridge Complex is the Hjort Trench which also has a ridge to its east. Some authors split the central part of the Macquarie Ridge Complex into two central segments where the ridge is to the west and the trench is to the east. Slightly confusingly the 5,500 m (18,000 ft) deep McDougall Trough is the trench to the east of the ridge of the Macquarie Fault Zone, with the other northern fault zone to the troughs north being named the McDougall Fault Zone. The trough has a step over basin to the Macquarie Fault Zone which commences where the Jurru fault zone in the southern Tasman Basin intercepts the plate boundaries. In the middle of the Macquarie Fault Zone is Macquarie Island. Its rocks like that of all the zone are mid-ocean ridge basalt or ocean island basalt.

The central part of Macquarie Ridge Complex has a maximum height of 433 m (1,421 ft) at Macquarie Island but the troughs to the east drop to 6,000 m (20,000 ft) below sea level. At Macquarie Island which is located about 4.5 km (2.8 mi) east of the Australian Pacific plate boundary the transform of this to the north of the island is a 15 km (9.3 mi) wide zone of closely spaced NNE- to NE-trending faults while to the south of the island north of the island the zone narrows to as little as 8 km (5.0 mi) with NNE to NNW-trending faults. The fault zone is up to 40 km (25 mi) wide, elsewhere and it often has parallel eastern and western ridge crests, as well as multiple nearby fracture zones.

== Earthquakes ==
The zone has in historic times been the source of some very large earthquakes and up until 1993 at least 20 over M_{w} 6.5 had been recorded. The currently seismically active area is the whole of the zone and parts to the west of its northern aspects in the northern South East Tasman Basin. However both west of Macquarie Island and to its east towards the southern tip of the Campbell Plateau there has been some historic earthquake activity outside the zone. In the Hjort Trench region the plate boundary is definitely under the stress condition of transpression as earthquake focal mechanisms are both thrust and dextral strike-slip types as found in such areas. To the south of the Hjort Trench there is relatively low grade seismic activity in the Emerald Fault Zone and towards the Macquarie triple junction. The largest strike-slip event till then on record occurred May 23, 1989, and had a magnitude of at least M_{w} 8.0 On 23 December 2004 a M_{w} 8.1 event occurred about 150 km (93 mi) to the west of the plate boundary. This event to the west of the plate boundary was close to the transition from oblique subduction at the Puysegur Trough to strike slip, with some compression, on the Macquarie Ridge. It is believed these large events are because the transition to oblique convergence with subduction is putting the area of what has been called the Macquarie Block under significant strain that is eventually relieved by major failure reactivating past transform faults in the oceanic crust of the Tasman sea floor.

== Volcanics ==
The basalts which are oceanic in the zone have been dated. To the south east of the Puysegur Trench a seamount is as young as 1.59 ± 0.26 million years. It is not yet known for sure if this relatively recent date could be related to late mid ocean ridge spreading or back arc activity. The recent dating of the adakitic Little Solander Island volcanics to the zone's far east to about 50,000 years ago suggests back arc activity from the subducted oceanic crust in the northern part of the zone may not have ceased. A northern sea mount of the McDougall Fault Zone is 10.9 ± 0.26 million years old while at the southern end there is one dated at 18.34 ± 0.53 million years old. A sea mount at the north of the smaller definition of the Macquarie Fault Zone is 14.1 ± 1.2 million years old and one beyond Macquarie Island to its south is 25.82 ± 0.18 million years old. Macquarie Island itself has multiple ages in the relatively limited range from 10.34 to 10 million years ago. A seamount near the eastern far end of the Hjort Trench is 25.90 ± 0.23 million years old.

== Tectonics ==
=== Present ===
The Macquarie Fault Zone includes a component of convergence which increases as it approaches the South Island of New Zealand where it merges into the Alpine Fault which cuts across the continental crust of New Zealand's South Island. The northern and southern ends of the zone are believed to be converging at between 2 and 4 cm (1.6 in)/year presently. It has been observed that the south western portion of the zone has the Pacific plate interacting with an area of the Indo-Australian plate termed the Macquarie microplate that has rotated independent of the Australian plate starting 6.24 million years ago. The best fit modelling of recent tectonics requires this microplate and there is evidence for a diffuse zone of deformation associated with compression between this microplate and the Australian plate but this diffuse zone is not particularly seismologically active presently. (Note: Microseismicity studies of the Macquarie Ridge Complex to aid in understanding the current tectonics have commenced but data collected between 2020 and 2022 has not yet been subjected to peer-reviewed analysis. UKRI, Abstract EGU23-9886) So while further studies take place the term Australian plate will be used to simplify the tectonics as of the present and this view is not inconsistent with the latest reference frames used in recent plate modelling. The oceanic crust of the Macquarie Fault Zone as found at Macquarie Island was generated however at the divergent Australian-Pacific plate boundary following break-up between the Campbell Plateau and Resolution Ridge between the middle Eocene about 40 million years ago and what was formally thought to be the late Miocene. However this cessation of seafloor spreading generally propagated from south at 25.9 million years ago to north along the ridge where it is now known that it might have stopped as recently as 1.6 million years ago although an earlier date remains possible. Many researchers conclude that the fault zone here is an incipient subduction zone, with oblique motion corresponding to the transition from lateral (strike-slip) motion. In the area known as the Puysegur Trench, the Indo-Australian plate appears to be starting to sink beneath the Pacific plate, the reverse of what is occurring off of New Zealand's North Island (see Kermadec-Tonga Subduction Zone).

The Macquarie Ridge represents both the different relative heights of the abutting plates as well as the component of compression between the plates. The namesake Macquarie Island, named after Lachlan Macquarie lies atop a segment of the Macquarie Ridge. The Australia-Pacific plate boundary is now understood to be along the crest of the ridges rather than in the troughs with a zone of deformation up to 100 km (62 mi) wide. This central area has had up to 290 km (180 mi) right lateral displacement since ocean floor spreading ceased at about 10 million years ago.

In the far south subduction is possibly initiating at the Hjort Trench. However this subduction has been described as atypical as lighter oceanic crust generated from the Southeast Indian Ridge is subducted under heavier oceanic crust from the extinct spreading center of the Australia-Pacific plate, where as normal subduction has the heavier component going under. This regions previous tectonic evolution has also been studied in detail as it is related to the Macquarie triple junction which was created about 47.91 million years ago.

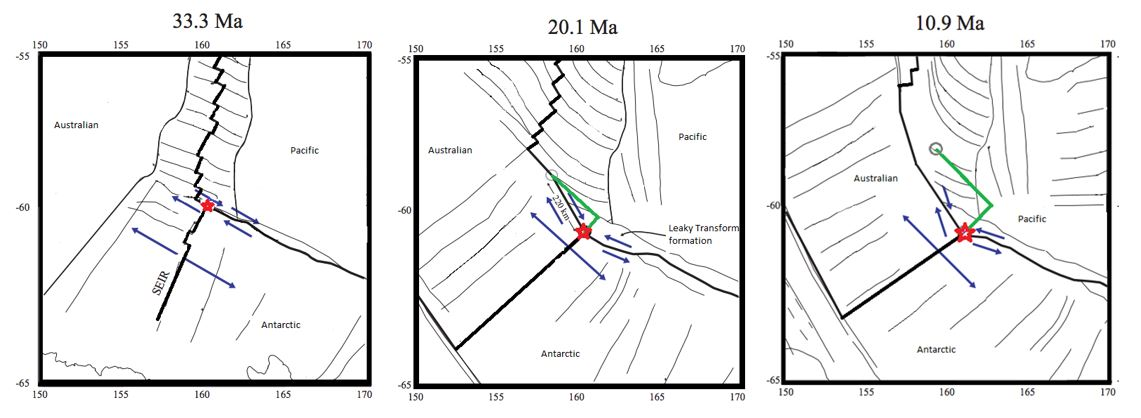
The evolution of the Macquarie triple junction over the last approximately 33 to 10 million years has involved to its north the southern portion of the Macquarie Fault Zone. The green line on the diagram shows the migration distance between time intervals.

=== Past ===
The Macquarie Ridge is a very long, but incompletely studied extinct mid-ocean ridge system which has since experienced complex tectonic processes over about 30 million years that have differed down its length as it became the Australian–Pacific plate boundary. Not all timings derived from different methodologies concord as well as they do for easier to study tectonic structures. It is postulated that because the lithosphere would cool and strengthen usually with mid oceanic ridge formation, that if such tectonic inversion is not rapid, it does not lead to the relative simplicity seen at say the Kermadec-Tonga subduction zone. This is not the case with the Macquarie ridge. The localised to segments transpression and compression seen in the Macquarie Ridge Complex took about 10 to 15 million years. The process is summarised as:

1. At about 42 million years ago the South East Tasman (Macquarie) Basin opened as the Campbell Plateau and Resolution Ridge separated.
2. After 30 million years ago the changes in relative motion of the Pacific plate and Australian plate caused oblique spreading of the initial Macquarie mid-ocean ridge. To adjust for changes in spreading direction, shorter segments developed and the fracture zones became curved.
3. Sometime before present seafloor spreading and magmatism ceased when the relative motions of the Australian and Pacific plates became too oblique to sustain extension.
4. The Macquarie microplate rotated independent of the Australian plate starting 6.24 million years ago and formed the south western margin of the zone but it is unclear if this continues now.

This last stage has been difficult to characterise as the usual approach through magnetic anomaly studies only allowed a good time for the central McDougall and Macquarie segments spreading ceasing by 24 million years ago and either end was only constrained to the 30 million years ago estimate. It is now known to have occurred differentially, with cessation of sea floor spreading happening at 25.9 million years ago in the south and possibly as recently as 1.6 million years ago near New Zealand. However it is known from elsewhere that basalt eruptions can continue for up to 3.5 million years after spreading stops so sea floor spreading in the north actually likely stopped sometime between 5 million and 1.6 million years ago if the single seamount sampled to date in this region is of mid oceanic ridge origin. And so to a degree the apparent clash with evidence that the Puysegur subduction initiated at 20 million years ago is less challenging to explain. Compositional analysis on this single sample does not exclude the possibility of later oceanic island type origin even if it seems to fit with other samples from the zone. Seafloor spreading must have ceased by 10 million years ago on the central Macquarie segment containing Macquarie Island. Since then the segments accommodated the two plates convergence by oceanic-oceanic subduction at the southern Hjort segment and at the northern Puysegur segment and by predominant strike-slip motion in the two central segments of the Macquarie Ridge structure. Maps of this tectonic activity have been modelled from 42 million years ago to the present showing the evolving spreading center, its extinction and fault zone relationships.
