= 2003 Fiordland earthquake =

Earthquake in New Zealand

- Location within New Zealand
- UTC time: 2003-08-21 12:12:49
- ISC event: 7066570
- USGS-ANSS: ComCat
- Local date: 22 August 2003
- Local time: 12:12 AM
- Magnitude: 7.2 M_{s}
- Depth: 12 km (7.5 mi)
- Epicentre: 45.104°S 167.144°E
- Areas affected: New Zealand, South Island
- Max. intensity: MMI VIII (Severe)
- Casualties: None

The 2003 Fiordland earthquake struck the remote region of Fiordland in the South Island of New Zealand on 22 August 2003, at 12:12 am NZST. The epicentre was 12 kilometres (7.5 mi) deep, and was thought to be near Secretary Island at the entrance to Doubtful Sound. At 7.2 M_{s} magnitude, it was one of the largest quakes in the country for some time, and was the largest shallow quake since the 1968 Inangahua earthquake. There was an aftershock two hours later at 2:12 am, followed over several days by frequent small tremors; two months after the earthquake, there had been 8,000 aftershocks.

Fiordland is one of the seismically active parts of the country according to GNS seismologist Dr. Warwick Smith, as they are a relief mechanism for stresses as the Australian and Pacific tectonic plates are being forced together in the area, with the Pacific plate subducting under the Australian plate.

In August 2004, there was another large earthquake of magnitude 7.1 M_{w} in Fiordland. This was the same location as an earthquake of 6.7 M_{s} magnitude on 10 August 1993.

== Earthquake ==
The magnitude 7.2 earthquake occurred on 22 August 2003, with an epicentre near Secretary Island in Fiordland. The largest shallow earthquake with a magnitude this high in New Zealand occurred 35 years prior.

There were over 8,000 recorded aftershocks in the two months following the main earthquake. Of these, 23 were at least magnitude five, and the largest measured 6.1.

== Damage ==
The Earthquake Commission received about 3,000 damage claims, totalling $10.5 million. Most of the earthquake damage occurred in the township of Te Anau, with about 64% of residents experiencing damage, mostly minor. Some 70 km to the south-east of the town, residents felt the quake strongly and items fell off shelves in shops and homes. Damage was generally minor, with some chimneys in Te Anau to Manapouri being cracked or broken. The earthquake also caused some concrete to crack in the control structure of Lake Te Anau, and collapses in Kepler Track.

External image
- Landslides in Fiordland

A team of geologists led by Ian Turnbull went to investigate and reported "landsliding on a large scale". They recorded at least 200 landslides after overflying seventy percent of central and western Fiordland. GNS Science recorded at least 400 landslides by November 2003.

There was also a tsunami, which occurred in two separate locations. One of them was caused by a landslide, had a run-length of 4–5 metres, and affected several hundred metres of Charles Sound and damaged a wharf. The other part was recorded as far Port Kembla, on the east coast of Australia, with a peak-to-trough height of 0.17 metres.

The earthquake also caused liquefaction in several places, such as on the coast of Lake Te Anau. Compared to other large New Zealand earthquakes, the liquefaction was minor.

== Response ==
Within 48 hours of the earthquake, two portable seismographs had been placed near the epicentre to record aftershocks. More portable seismographs were later used.

== See also ==
- 2009 Dusky Sound earthquake
- List of earthquakes in 2003
- List of earthquakes in New Zealand
