= List of earthquakes in 1961 =

Earthquakes in 1961
Approximate epicenters of the earthquakes in 1961
- 4.0–5.9 magnitude
- 6.0–6.9 magnitude
- 7.0–7.9 magnitude
- 8.0+ magnitude
- Strongest magnitude: Peru, Madre de Dios Region, (Magnitude 7.6) August 19
- Deadliest: Iran, Fars province (Magnitude 6.4) June 11 60 deaths
- Total fatalities: 128

Number by magnitude
- 9.0+: 0
- 8.0–8.9: 0
- 7.0–7.9: 15
- 6.0–6.9: 91
- 5.0–5.9: 2

This is a list of earthquakes in 1961. Only magnitude 6.0 or greater earthquakes appear on the list. Lower magnitude events are included if they have caused death, injury or damage. Events which occurred in remote areas will be excluded from the list as they wouldn't have generated significant media interest. All dates are listed according to UTC time. A fairly busy year although the largest event was only a magnitude 7.6. This was a big contrast to 1960 which had three events above magnitude 8. Peru had the largest event. Japan had five magnitude 7.0+ events. Overall there was not a great deal of deaths with the total being 128. Iran had the most with 60 from an event in June.

== Overall ==
=== By death toll ===
Rank	Death toll	Magnitude	Location	MMI	Depth (km)	Date
1	60	6.4	Iran, Fars province	VIII (Severe)	15.0	June 11
2	30	6.2	Ethiopia, Amhara Region	IX (Violent)	25.0	June 1
3	23	6.7	Colombia, Tolima Department	( )	162.9	December 20
4	10	6.8	Japan, Ishikawa Prefecture, Honshu	VII (Very strong)	15.0	August 19

- Note: At least 10 casualties

=== By magnitude ===
Rank	Magnitude	Death toll	Location	MMI	Depth (km)	Date
1	7.6	0	Peru, Madre de Dios Region	( )	612.2	August 19
= 2	7.5	2	Japan, Miyazaki Prefecture, Kyushu	X (Extreme)	35.0	February 26
= 2	7.5	0	Peru, Ucayali Region	( )	619.9	August 31
3	7.4	0	New Zealand, Kermadec Islands	( )	421.1	June 18
= 4	7.3	0	Indonesia, Gulf of Tomini	( )	144.8	March 28
= 4	7.3	0	New Hebrides, Vanuatu	VII (Very strong)	25.0	July 23
= 4	7.3	0	United Kingdom, South Sandwich Islands	( )	129.2	September 1
= 5	7.2	0	Japan, off the east coast of Honshu	V (Moderate)	30.0	January 16
= 5	7.2	0	Peru, Madre de Dios Region	( )	597.5	August 31
= 6	7.1	0	Japan, eastern Hokkaido	VIII (Severe)	43.9	August 11
= 6	7.1	0	United Kingdom, South Sandwich Islands	( )	100.9	September 8
= 7	7.0	0	Japan, off the east coast of Honshu	V (Moderate)	30.0	January 16
= 7	7.0	0	New Zealand, Kermadec Islands	( )	30.0	March 7
= 7	7.0	0	China, southern Xinjiang Province	IX (Violent)	35.0	April 13
= 7	7.0	0	Japan, Ryukyu Islands	V (Moderate)	30.6	July 18

- Note: At least 7.0 magnitude

== Notable events ==
=== January ===
January
- Strongest magnitude: 7.2 M_{w} Japan
- Total fatalities: 0

Number by magnitude
- 8.0–8.9: 0
- 7.0–7.9: 2
- 6.0–6.9: 9

Date	Country and location	M_{w}	Depth (km)	MMI	Notes	Casualties	
Date	Country and location	M_{w}	Depth (km)	MMI	Notes	Dead	Injured
2	United Kingdom, Santa Cruz Islands, Solomon Islands	6.8	79.3				
5	United States, Andreanof Islands, Alaska	6.5	31.9				
5	Australia, East Sepik Province, Papua and New Guinea	6.9	142.7				
5	France, southeast of the Loyalty Islands, New Caledonia	6.6	35.0	rowspan="2"| Doublet earthquake.			
5	France, southeast of the Loyalty Islands, New Caledonia	6.6	35.0				
10	Soviet Union, Kuril Islands, Russian SFSR	6.6	58.5	VI			
16	Japan, off the east coast of Honshu	7.2	30.0	V			
16	Japan, off the east coast of Honshu	6.3	30.0	IV	Aftershock.		
16	Japan, off the east coast of Honshu	7.0	30.0	V	Aftershock.		
16	Japan, off the east coast of Honshu	6.7	30.0	V	Aftershock.		
22	United Kingdom, Santa Cruz Islands, Solomon Islands	6.8	15.0				

=== February ===
February
- Strongest magnitude: 7.5 M_{w} Japan
- Deadliest: 7.5 M_{w} Japan; 2 deaths
- Total fatalities: 2

Number by magnitude
- 8.0–8.9: 0
- 7.0–7.9: 1
- 6.0–6.9: 8

Date	Country and location	M_{w}	Depth (km)	MMI	Notes	Casualties	
Date	Country and location	M_{w}	Depth (km)	MMI	Notes	Dead	Injured
4	Taiwan, off the east coast	6.1	35.0				
6	Australia, Bougainville Island, Papua and New Guinea	6.5	45.0	VI			
12	Soviet Union, Kuril Islands, Russia	6.9	38.1	V			
12	Soviet Union, Kuril Islands, Russia	6.3	34.0		Aftershock.		
14	Soviet Union, Kuril Islands, Russia	6.0	45.7		Aftershock.		
15	Soviet Union, Kuril Islands, Russia	6.1	33.9		Aftershock.		
26	Japan, Miyazaki Prefecture, Kyushu	7.5	35.0	X	2 people were killed and a further 7 were injured. 170 homes were damaged and another 170 were destroyed. A tsunami was reported.	2	7
26	Philippines, Luzon	6.1	15.0				
27	United States, Fox Islands (Alaska)	6.1	30.0				

=== March ===
March
- Strongest magnitude: 7.3 M_{w} Indonesia
- Deadliest: 6.5 M_{w} Indonesia; 2 deaths
- Total fatalities: 2

Number by magnitude
- 8.0–8.9: 0
- 7.0–7.9: 2
- 6.0–6.9: 7

Date	Country and location	M_{w}	Depth (km)	MMI	Notes	Casualties	
Date	Country and location	M_{w}	Depth (km)	MMI	Notes	Dead	Injured
7	New Zealand, Kermadec Islands	7.0	30.0				
7	China, Hubei Province	4.9	0.0	VII	25 homes were destroyed. Unknown depth.		
11	France, Gulf of Tadjoura, Djibouti	6.2	15.0	VIII			
15	Australia, west of New Ireland (island), Papua and New Guinea	6.1	30.0	V			
16	Indonesia, off the north coast of Flores	6.5	45.0	VIII	2 people were killed and a further 6 were injured. Some damage was caused.	2	6
16	Indonesia, Flores	6.0	35.0	VI	Aftershock.		
18	New Zealand, Auckland Islands	6.7	15.0				
20	Tonga	6.8	213.0				
28	Indonesia, Gulf of Tomini	7.3	144.8				
28	United States, Andreanof Islands, Alaska	6.1	45.4				

=== April ===
April
- Strongest magnitude: 7.0 M_{w} China
- Total fatalities: 0

Number by magnitude
- 8.0–8.9: 0
- 7.0–7.9: 1
- 6.0–6.9: 7

Date	Country and location	M_{w}	Depth (km)	MMI	Notes	Casualties	
Date	Country and location	M_{w}	Depth (km)	MMI	Notes	Dead	Injured
1	China, southern Xinjiang Province	6.8	20.0	VIII			
4	China, southern Xinjiang Province	6.3	20.0	VII	Aftershock.		
8	Chile, Araucania Region	6.2	25.0	VI			
8	United States, Northern Mariana Islands	6.5	104.6				
9	Taiwan, off the east coast	6.9	35.0	VI			
12	El Salvador, San Vicente Department	6.0	65.0	V			
13	China, southern Xinjiang Province	7.0	35.0	IX	53 homes were destroyed.		
23	Soviet Union, Kuril Islands, Russia	6.7	31.6				

=== May ===
May
- Strongest magnitude: 6.6 M_{w} United Kingdom
- Total fatalities: 0

Number by magnitude
- 8.0–8.9: 0
- 7.0–7.9: 0
- 6.0–6.9: 10

Date	Country and location	M_{w}	Depth (km)	MMI	Notes	Casualties	
Date	Country and location	M_{w}	Depth (km)	MMI	Notes	Dead	Injured
7	Australia, west of Bougainville Island, Papua and New Guinea	6.2	60.0	V			
7	Philippines, east of Mindanao	6.3	75.0				
11	Chile, Bio-Bio Region	6.1	25.0	VI			
16	Japan, southeast of Kyushu	6.0	25.5				
22	Tonga	6.0	27.0				
23	Turkey, off the coast of Mugla Province	6.4	35.0	VI			
23	Nicaragua, Chinandega Department	6.2	102.4	V			
28	United Kingdom, south of Fiji	6.6	228.0				
31	Mexico, Gulf of California	6.0	15.0				
31	Australia, East New Britain Province, Papua and New Guinea	6.0	50.0	V			

=== June ===
June
- Strongest magnitude: 7.4 M_{w} New Zealand
- Deadliest: 6.4 M_{w} Iran; 60 deaths
- Total fatalities: 90

Number by magnitude
- 8.0–8.9: 0
- 7.0–7.9: 1
- 6.0–6.9: 10
- 5.0–5.9: 1

Date	Country and location	M_{w}	Depth (km)	MMI	Notes	Casualties	
Date	Country and location	M_{w}	Depth (km)	MMI	Notes	Dead	Injured
1	Ethiopia, Amhara Region	6.2	25.0	IX	30 people were killed and at least 101 were injured. Some damage was caused.	30	101+
2	Ethiopia, Amhara Region	6.0	20.0	VIII	Aftershock.		
4	China, western Xizang Province	6.2	15.0	VII			
9	Soviet Union, Caspian Sea, offshore Azerbaijan	6.0	35.0				
11	Iran, Fars province	6.4	15.0	VIII	60 people were killed and major damage was caused.	60	
11	China, Yunnan Province	5.6	15.0	VIII	5,740 homes were destroyed.		
14	Guatemala, off the west coast	6.0	100.0				
16	Colombia, Cesar Department	6.2	114.4				
18	New Zealand, Kermadec Islands	7.4	421.1				
19	Philippines, off the west coast of Tablas Island	6.0	25.0	VI			
19	Afghanistan, Badakhshan Province	6.7	195.1				
27	China, Yunnan Province	6.1	15.0	VIII	11,400 homes were destroyed.		

=== July ===
July
- Strongest magnitude: 7.3 M_{w} New Hebrides
- Total fatalities: 0

Number by magnitude
- 8.0–8.9: 0
- 7.0–7.9: 2
- 6.0–6.9: 8

Date	Country and location	M_{w}	Depth (km)	MMI	Notes	Casualties	
Date	Country and location	M_{w}	Depth (km)	MMI	Notes	Dead	Injured
6	New Hebrides, Vanuatu	6.6	34.9				
7	Australia, West New Britain Province, Papua and New Guinea	6.5	48.4	VI			
8	France, Loyalty Islands, New Caledonia	6.1	35.0	rowspan="2"| Doublet earthquake.			
8	France, Loyalty Islands, New Caledonia	6.2	35.0				
18	Japan, Ryukyu Islands	7.0	30.6	V			
23	New Hebrides, Vanuatu	6.1	25.0		Foreshock.		
23	New Hebrides, Vanuatu	6.0	25.0		Foreshock.		
23	New Hebrides, Vanuatu	7.3	25.0	VII	A tsunami was caused with minor damage being reported.		
26	New Zealand, off the north coast	6.5	145.0				
28	Ecuador, Pastaza Province	6.6	142.1	V			

=== August ===
August
- Strongest magnitude: 7.6 M_{w} Peru
- Deadliest: 6.8 M_{w} Japan; 10 deaths
- Total fatalities: 10

Number by magnitude
- 8.0–8.9: 0
- 7.0–7.9: 4
- 6.0–6.9: 5

Date	Country and location	M_{w}	Depth (km)	MMI	Notes	Casualties	
Date	Country and location	M_{w}	Depth (km)	MMI	Notes	Dead	Injured
1	United Kingdom, eastern Guadalcanal, Solomon Islands	6.4	25.0	VI			
11	Japan, eastern Hokkaido	7.1	43.9	VIII			
11	Indonesia, eastern Sulawesi	6.0	20.0	VII			
14	New Hebrides, Vanuatu	6.0	50.0				
17	Soviet Union, Kuril Islands, Russia	6.5	151.0				
19	Peru, Madre de Dios Region	7.6	612.2				
19	Japan, Ishikawa Prefecture, Honshu	6.8	15.0	VII	10 people were killed and some damage was caused.	10	
31	Peru, Madre de Dios Region	7.2	597.5		Foreshock.		
31	Peru, Ucayali Region	7.5	619.9				

=== September ===
September
- Strongest magnitude: 7.3 M_{w} United Kingdom
- Total fatalities: 0

Number by magnitude
- 8.0–8.9: 0
- 7.0–7.9: 2
- 6.0–6.9: 7

Date	Country and location	M_{w}	Depth (km)	MMI	Notes	Casualties	
Date	Country and location	M_{w}	Depth (km)	MMI	Notes	Dead	Injured
1	United Kingdom, South Sandwich Islands	7.3	129.2				
5	Soviet Union, Gorno-Badakhshan, Tajikistan	6.0	130.0				
5	United States, Kenai Peninsula, Alaska	6.0	44.0	VI			
8	United Kingdom, South Sandwich Islands	7.1	100.9				
11	Venezuela, off the coast of	6.1	120.6				
17	Taiwan, off the east coast	6.1	34.1				
19	Bolivia, Chuquisaca Department	6.5	574.8				
20	Australia, eastern Bismarck Sea, Papua and New Guinea	6.0	15.0				
29	Indonesia, Minahasa Peninsula	6.0	75.0				

=== October ===
October
- Strongest magnitude: 6.8 M_{w} Indonesia
- Deadliest: 6.6 M_{w} Chile; 1 death
- Total fatalities: 1+

Number by magnitude
- 8.0–8.9: 0
- 7.0–7.9: 0
- 6.0–6.9: 7
- 5.0–5.9: 1

Date	Country and location	M_{w}	Depth (km)	MMI	Notes	Casualties	
Date	Country and location	M_{w}	Depth (km)	MMI	Notes	Dead	Injured
1	China, Gansu Province	5.7	0.0	VII	10 homes were destroyed. Unknown depth.		
8	Indonesia, west of Halmahera	6.8	120.0				
10	Indonesia, Papua (province)	6.3	265.0				
18	Chile, Concepcion, Chile	6.6	20.0	VII	At least 1 person was killed and some damage was caused.	1+	
19	Argentina, Neuquen Province	6.2	149.0				
23	Indonesia, Talaud Islands	6.2	15.0				
26	Australia, Bismarck Sea, Papua and New Guinea	6.5	20.0				
26	Indonesia, Batu Islands	6.2	28.9	VI			

=== November ===
November
- Strongest magnitude: 6.6 M_{w} Indonesia
- Total fatalities: 0

Number by magnitude
- 8.0–8.9: 0
- 7.0–7.9: 0
- 6.0–6.9: 5

Date	Country and location	M_{w}	Depth (km)	MMI	Notes	Casualties	
Date	Country and location	M_{w}	Depth (km)	MMI	Notes	Dead	Injured
15	Japan, off the east coast of Hokkaido	6.5	43.0	VII			
16	Dominican Republic, La Altagracia Province	6.0	155.0				
19	Indonesia, Minahasa Peninsula	6.6	185.0				
27	Japan, off the southeast coast of Kyushu	6.2	65.0	VI			
27	Indonesia, Bacan Islands	6.2	25.0	VI			

=== December ===
December
- Strongest magnitude: 6.7 M_{w} 2 events
- Deadliest: 6.7 M_{w} Colombia; 23 deaths
- Total fatalities: 23

Number by magnitude
- 8.0–8.9: 0
- 7.0–7.9: 0
- 6.0–6.9: 8

Date	Country and location	M_{w}	Depth (km)	MMI	Notes	Casualties	
Date	Country and location	M_{w}	Depth (km)	MMI	Notes	Dead	Injured
4	China, southern Qinghai Province	6.1	15.8	VII			
9	Chile, off the coast of Los Lagos Region	6.7	25.0				
14	Indonesia, Papua (province)	6.0	15.0	VI			
20	Colombia, Tolima Department	6.7	162.9		23 people were killed and major damage was caused.	23	
24	Japan, Hokkaido	6.0	118.0				
24	Chile, off the coast of Bio-Bio Region	6.1	25.0	VI			
27	New Zealand, Wellington Region, North Island	6.4	20.0	VII			
30	United States, Rat Islands, Alaska	6.5	15.0				
