= 2009 Dusky Sound earthquake =

Earthquake in New Zealand

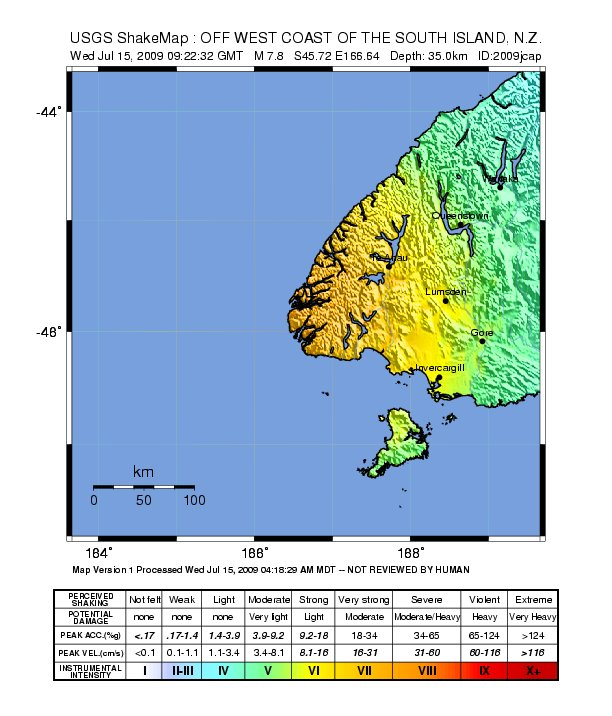
- USGS ShakeMap

- Location within New Zealand
- UTC time: 2009-07-15 09:22:29
- ISC event: 15157724
- USGS-ANSS: ComCat
- Local date: 15 July 2009
- Local time: 21:22 NZST (UTC+13)
- Magnitude: 7.8 M_{w}
- Depth: 12 km (7 mi)
- Epicentre: 45.762°S 166.562°E
- Type: Reverse fault
- Areas affected: New Zealand
- Max. intensity: MMI VI (Strong)
- Tsunami: 230 cm (91 in)
- Aftershocks: >1,000
- Casualties: None

A M_{w} 7.8 earthquake struck a remote region of Fiordland, New Zealand, on 15 July 2009 at 21:22 local time (09:22 UTC). It had an initially–reported depth of 12 km (7.5 mi), and an epicentre near Dusky Sound in Fiordland National Park, which is 160 km (99 mi) north-west of Invercargill. It was the country's largest earthquake magnitude since the 1931 Hawke's Bay earthquake, but caused only minor damage and there were no casualties. A tsunami accompanied the event and had a maximum measured run-up of 230 cm (91 in).

== Earthquake ==
New Zealand's Institute of Geological and Nuclear Sciences (GNS Science) initially measured the earthquake at M_{L} 6.6. The United States Geological Survey's preliminary measurement was M_{w} 8.0 before it was revised to 7.8. It was New Zealand's biggest earthquake magnitude since the 1931 Hawke's Bay earthquake, and equal in magnitude to the 2016 Kaikōura earthquake. The 2009 earthquake occurred after a sequence of seismic events in northern Fiordland since 1988—six earthquakes above magnitude 6.0 struck the region prior to 2009, including a magnitude 7.2 earthquake in 2003.

The hypocentre was near Resolution Island in Dusky Sound, Fiordland, at a depth that was initially reported as 12 km (7.5 mi). The earthquake was the result of shallow reverse faulting at the subduction zone of the Indo-Australian plate and Pacific plate. At this location, the Indo-Australian plate subducts obliquely beneath the Pacific plate along the Puysegur Trench at a rate of 34 mm (1.3 in) per year. The oblique interaction is also accommodated by strike-slip deformation along the Alpine Fault.

An early model of the rupture calculated that it initiated at a depth of 30 km (19 mi) and propagated southwards and upwards before it ceased just 15 km (9.3 mi) beneath the surface. Subsequent analysis showed that the rupture started at 38 km (24 mi) depth and ended at 8 km (5.0 mi). The rupture occurred within a 36 km × 44 km (22 mi × 27 mi) region on the subduction zone. Maximum displacement was estimated at 8.9 m (29 ft) about 23 km (14 mi) beneath the surface, occurring about 16 seconds after the earthquake began. As the rupture mainly propagated away from the mainland, the measured shaking intensity was less than what would normally be expected given the earthquake's magnitude and shallow depth. The earthquake's epicentre was in a remote region where few seismic stations were installed, and as a result, limited recordings of strong ground motion were made.

Shaking reportedly lasted for at least a minute, and was felt throughout the South Island and in the lower North Island as far away as New Plymouth. GNS Science described the ground motion as relatively slow with a "lower frequency shaking" as opposed to abrupt, "rolling" motion from higher frequency shaking. The ground motion characteristic resulted in relatively few landslides.

Thousands of aftershocks occurred, with most being too small to be felt. One of the larger aftershocks measured magnitude 6.1, and occurred 19 minutes after the mainshock. Most of them were distributed at the two edges of the rupture. These aftershocks had focal mechanisms indicating reverse and strike-slip faulting.

== Effects ==
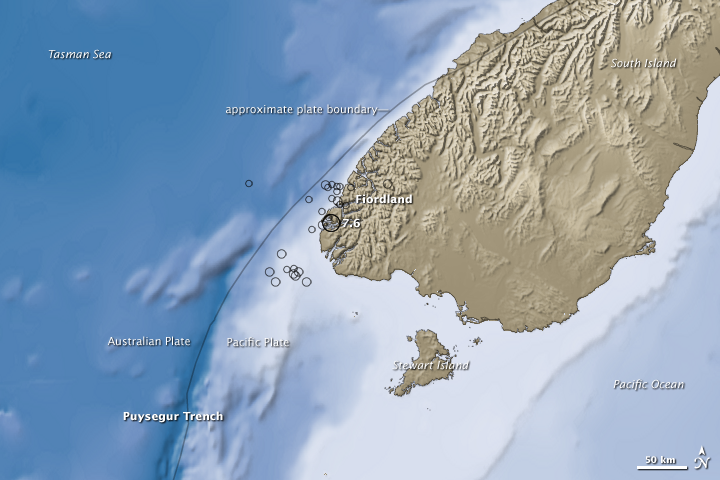
NASA map showing epicentre of earthquake and its aftershocks

There was only minor damage and no human casualties. A few buildings in Invercargill experienced minor damage, and power outages occurred in several parts of the South Island. At least 241 landslides were recorded over an area of about 5,600 km^{2} (2,200 sq mi). By comparison, the number of landslides was half that recorded after the 2003 Fiordland earthquake.

From 21:30, KiwiRail suspended rail services south of Oamaru and in Buller Gorge to check for damage. Services were operational again by midnight because no damage was found. Prime Minister John Key responded that people could "thank their lucky stars" due to the lack of damage. In 2018, The New Zealand Herald described the earthquake as a "forgotten monster", due to it being followed by much more destructive quakes, such as the 2011 Christchurch earthquake.

By 2010, the Earthquake Commission paid out $6.1 million in earthquake compensation after receiving 5,219 claims. The low level of damage, despite the magnitude of the earthquake, was attributed to its remote location, slow moment release rate, low-frequency shaking, and New Zealand's building standards.

Puysegur Point, on the southwestern tip of the island, moved westwards by 30 cm (12 in). Te Anau moved 10 cm (3.9 in), Bluff, 3 cm (1.2 in), and Dunedin, 1 cm (0.39 in). Around the epicentre, a large area was uplifted by approximately 1 m (3 ft 3 in). The earthquake is also believed to have raised the Coulomb stress in the southern, offshore part of the Alpine Fault.

== Tsunami ==
Tsunami warnings were issued soon after the earthquake by authorities in New Zealand and Australia, as well as by the Pacific Tsunami Warning Center in Hawaii. Civil defence officials in Southland also issued a "potential tsunami" warning, stating their concerns about widely varying measurements of the earthquake. Reacting to the Pacific warnings, about 50 residents and tourists on Lord Howe Island were evacuated, and in Sydney a theatre in Bondi Beach was evacuated and residents were told to keep away from the shore. The tsunami warnings were subsequently cancelled or reduced. The tsunami reached a height of 1 m (3 ft 3 in) in Jackson Bay, 25 cm (9.8 in) at Charleston, 12 cm (4.7 in) at Dog Island, 14 cm (5.5 in) at Port Kembla, and 6 cm (2.4 in) at Spring Bay. A maximum run-up of 230 cm (91 in) was recorded; however, the tsunami may have been higher in some areas that were not surveyed due to the remoteness of the affected region.

== See also ==
- List of earthquakes in 2009
- List of earthquakes in New Zealand
