= Meeberrie =

Pastoral lease in Western Australia

Coordinates: 26°35′S 115°35′E

Location in Western Australia

Meeberrie is a homestead and station name in the Murchison district of Western Australia. The station is situated approximately 160 kilometres (99 mi) north of Mullewa.

The Butcher family were the first leaseholders of the station and arrived from Victoria in 1876. The heritage listed station homestead was architect designed and built of local stone between 1917 and 1919. The homestead has an iron roof, a verandah surrounds the building and has two bay windows. A detached building with the jackaroo quarters, laundry and storeroom is found behind the main building.

The station occupies an area of 1,852 square kilometres (715 sq mi) of which 118 square kilometres (46 sq mi) is composed of reserves and crown land. The soil has a low level of erosion with 87% of the land being described as nil or minor. The perennial vegetation condition is poor with 66% of vegetation cover being described as poor or very poor.

In 1915, Alf Cream took 2350 sheep from the Butcher's Boolathana Station and drove them overland for nine weeks to Meeberrie. The journey should have taken five weeks but the country was waterlogged following twenty consecutive days of heavy rain. The Wooramel River had risen 20 feet (6 m) and the drovers had to wait nine days to cross.

A magnitude 6.8 earthquake (also claimed at 7.2 magnitude) hit the property on 29 April 1941, the largest on-shore quake to be recorded in Australia.

The current lessee is Laststar Investments, Meeberrie is operating under the Crown Lease number CL178-1966 and has the Land Act number LA3114/512.

== See also ==
- Earthquakes in Western Australia
