= Meckering, Western Australia =

Meckering
- Town
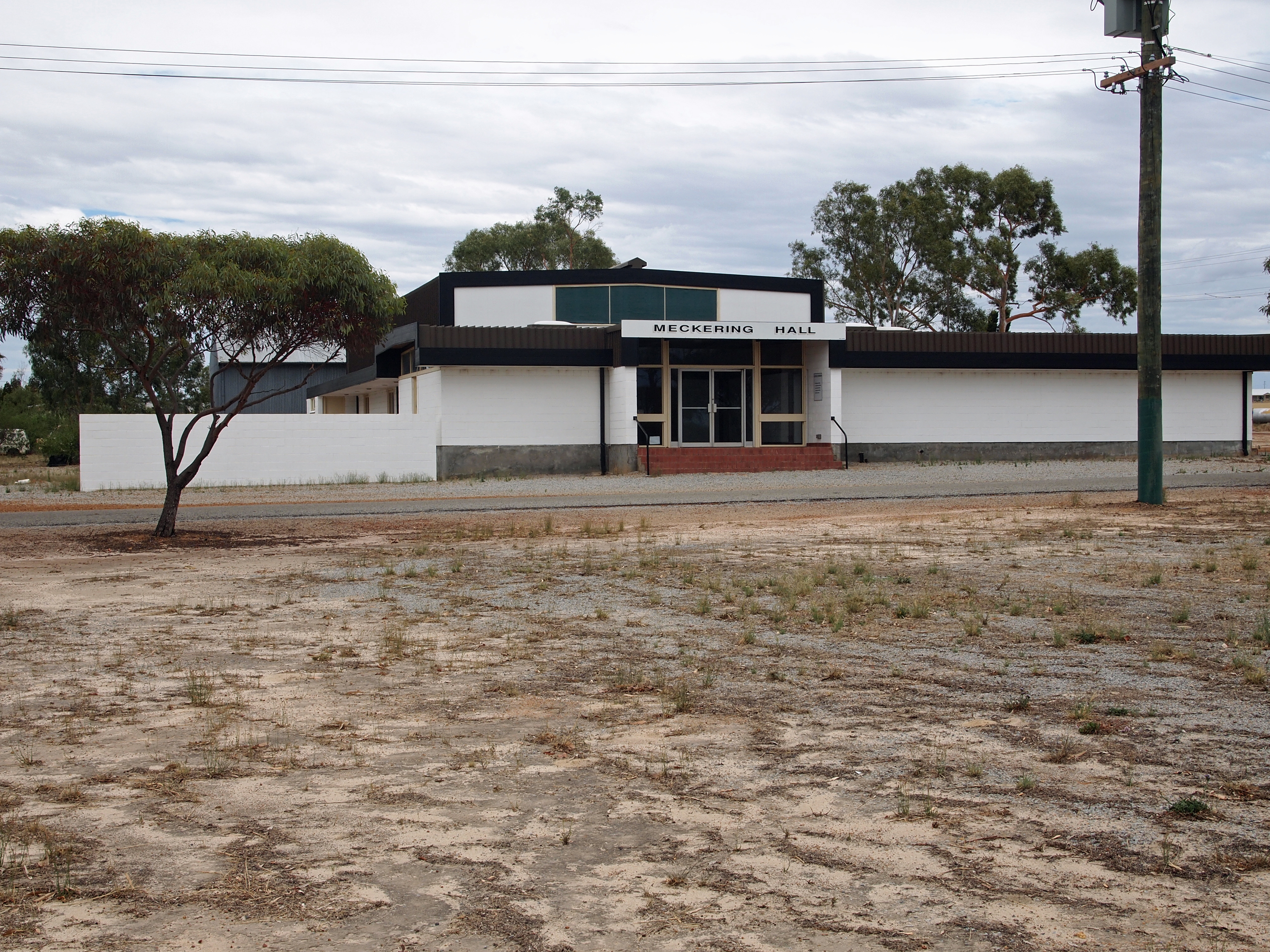
- Meckering Hall

- Interactive map of Meckering
- Coordinates: 31°38′S 117°00′E
- Country: Australia
- State: Western Australia
- LGA: Shire of Cunderdin
- Location: 130 km (81 mi) east of Perth; 32 km (20 mi) east of Northam; 22 km (14 mi) west of Cunderdin
- Established: 1895

Government
  - State electorate: Central Wheatbelt
  - Federal division: Durack

Area
  - Total: 216 km^{2} (83 sq mi)
- Elevation: 203 m (666 ft)

Population
  - Total: 232 (SAL 2021)
- Postcode: 6405

Meckering is a town 130 kilometres (80.8 mi) east of Perth, Western Australia along the Great Eastern Highway. Meckering is located within the Shire of Cunderdin.

A railway line was completed in the area in 1895 and Meckering was selected as a station site. The first name chosen for the townsite was Beebering, the Aboriginal name for the hills just north of the town.

The townsite of Beebering was gazetted in 1895. The name of the town was changed to Meckering in 1897 to agree with the station name and the name for the town that was used locally. Meckering is an Aboriginal word thought to mean "moon on the water" or "good hunting".

In early 1898 the population of the town was 225, 150 males and 75 females.

In 1932 the Wheat Pool of Western Australia announced that the town would have two grain elevators, each fitted with an engine, installed at the railway siding.

The surrounding areas produce wheat and other cereal crops. The town is a receival site for Cooperative Bulk Handling.

== Earthquake ==
The town was struck by an earthquake on Monday 14 October 1968.

The earthquake occurred at 10:58:52 local time, with a moment magnitude of 6.5 and a maximum Mercalli intensity of IX (Violent). Total damage amounted to $2.2 million with 20–28 injured.

== Transport ==
=== Road freight ===
Meckering is a main stopping point for freight trucks on the way to the eastern states.

=== Passenger rail service ===
The MerredinLink service runs between East Perth and Merredin thrice weekly, stopping at Meckering. The Prospector service between East Perth and Kalgoorlie stops at Meckering most days.

== Photography museum ==
Meckering is home to "The Big Camera" – so named because the building resembles a camera – a museum of photography with a collection of over 4000 cameras. The collection includes items from the late 1800s up to modern cameras, as well as related items such as projectors and light meters.

== See also ==
- Earthquakes in Western Australia
