= Macquarie triple junction =

Place where the Indo-Australian plate, Pacific plate, and Antarctic plate meet

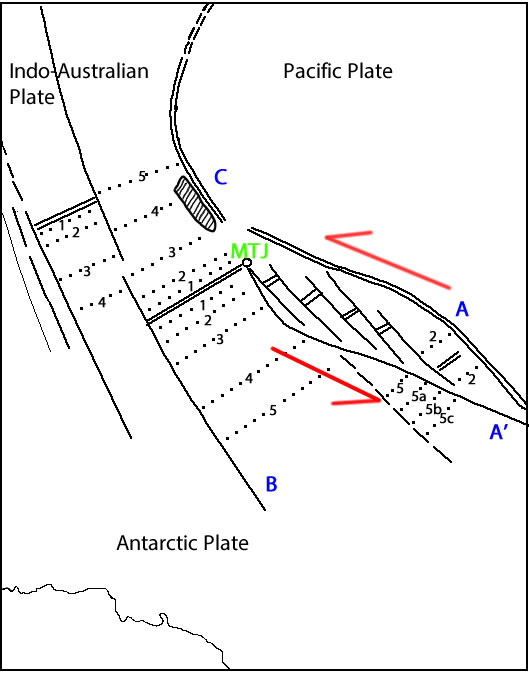
Figure 1: The present Macquarie triple junction portrays the three most common oceanic tectonic boundaries. The first is Emerald Fracture Zone, a leaky transform fault, which is the region between A and A'. The second is the Southeast Indian Ridge, located just west of the MTJ and is split by the Balleny Fault Zone, identified by the letter B. And lastly the Hjort Trench which is represented by C. The Macquarie microplate occupies an ill-defined southern region of the area labelled as the Indo-Australian plate which for the last 3 million years has been a separate Australian plate

The Macquarie triple junction is a geologically active tectonic boundary located at 61°30′S 161°0′E at which the historic Indo-Australian plate, Pacific plate, and Antarctic plate collide and interact. The term triple junction is given to particular tectonic boundaries at which three separate tectonic plates meet at a specific, singular location. The Macquarie triple junction is located on the seafloor of the southern region of the Pacific Ocean, just south of New Zealand. This tectonic boundary was named in respect to the nearby Macquarie Island, which is located southeast of New Zealand.

== Evolution, stability, and migration ==
Our understanding of the evolution of the Macquarie triple junction was made possible due to extensive research of the regions tectonic magnetic anomalies as well as local fractures reconstruction. The origin of the Macquarie triple junction has been interpreted to have occurred 47.91 Mya (million years ago), based on Anomaly 21. Thorough reconstruction of the Macquarie triple junction begins at 33.3 Mya, in respect to Anomaly 13o, and can be simply described as a southeastward migration of approximately 1100 km in respect to the Indo-Australian plate. The total migration was largely driven by the Australian–Pacific transform boundary.

At 33.3 Mya, the Macquarie triple junction was a stable ridge–transform fault–transform fault triple junction. In reference to the Australian plate, the triple junction moved southeast at an angle of 120° at an approximate rate of 40 km/million years. This trajectory remain relatively constant throughout the Oligocene from 33.3 to 20.1 Mya. During this period of time the Australian-Pacific boundary underwent a transformation from mid-ocean ridge to a strike-slip fault and lastly at 20.1 Mya to a transpression convergent boundary.

Then 10.9 Mya, the Macquarie triple junction evolved into a ridge–trench–fault triple junction due to the alteration of the Australian–Pacific boundary motion. This oblique convergent boundary instigated a clockwise rotation of the Macquarie Ridge complex forming the Hjort Trench and numerous fracture zones around the Macquarie Ridge. This rotation also transpired into the Macquarie triple junction changing its migration path to an angle of 150° and rate of 34 km/million years in reference to the Australian plate, making the migration direction southward.

Between 5.9 and 2.6 Mya, the Macquarie triple junction evolved back into a ridge–transform fault–transform fault triple junction as the convergence at the Hjort Trench diminished and Antarctic–Pacific spreading boundary changed back into a transform fault. Elsewhere the Australian plate before 3 million years ago separated again from the Indian plate. Already on the Indo-Australian plate independent rotational motion had developed in a small distal portion of what is now the Australian plate, and this created a Macquire microplate. This resulted in the current state of the Macquarie triple junction and is interpreted as a ridge–fault–fault triple junction that now involves a Macquarie microplate rather than the Indo-Australian plate as was the case before 6 million years ago, Pacific plate and Antarctic plate.

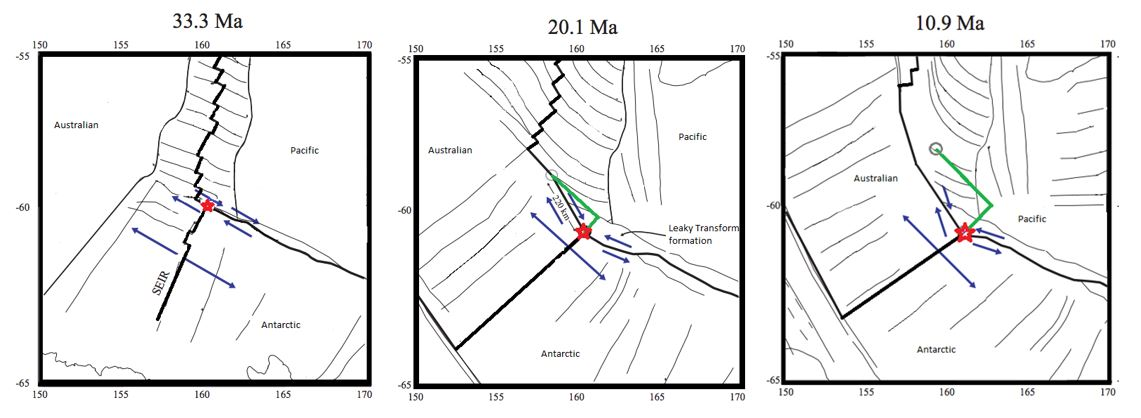
Figure 2: The evolution of the Macquarie triple junction has been well studied dating back to 33.3 Mya and has been reconstructed in at 20.1 Mya and 10.9 Mya. The green line shows the migration distance between intervals. The label Australian refers to the Indo-Australian plate at the times illustrated.

== Local tectonics ==
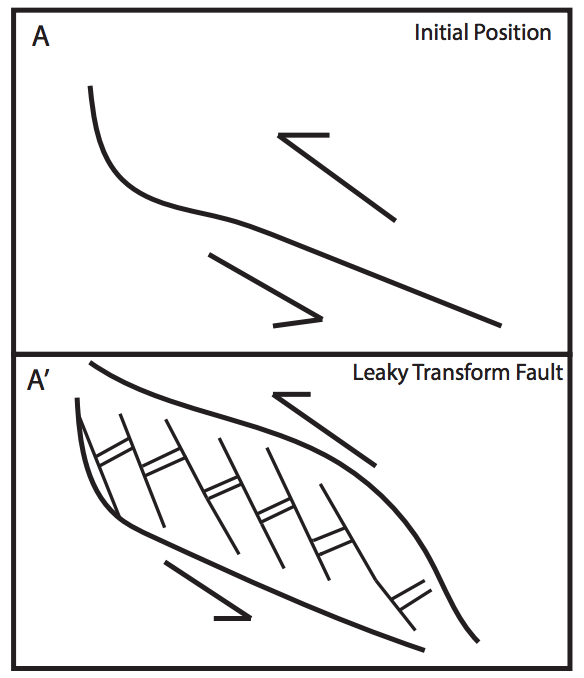
Figure 3: Leaky transform faults, such as the Emerald Fracture Zone, form at bends in transform boundaries.

Figure 4: New crust forms at ridges, such as mid-ocean ridges, while older crust is destroyed at subduction zones, where trenches form.

=== Emerald Fracture Zone ===
The Emerald Fracture Zone is the westernmost portion of the Pacific–Antarctic Ridge and is a young leaky transform fault zone, no older than 2.197-2.229 Ma. This zone was formed during a change in the Pacific–Antarctic plate boundary between 3.4 and 3.86 Ma during a transformation of the Pacific–Antarctic plate boundary. This transformation was due to the change in the absolute motion of the Pacific plate in response to Louisville hotspot activity. The alteration of the Pacific plate's motion caused a left-lateral strike-slip fault to form at the Pacific–Antarctic boundary. This strike-slip fault is located near the triple junction along a sharp bend in the westernmost region of the Pacific–Antarctic boundary. This sharp bend is now the locality of the Emerald Fracture Zone formed from a release bend configuration as seen in transtension.

=== Southeast Indian Ridge ===
The Southeast Indian Ridge is the divergent boundary that separates the Indo-Australian and Antarctic plates. This boundary has experienced a vast right-lateral transform fault called the Balleny Fault Zone, which is also thought to be caused in response to the formation of the Emerald Fracture Zone. This large offset in the Southeast Indian Ridge is thought to have produced a significant difference in crustal thickness within the Australian plate influencing the Hjort Trench formation.

=== Hjort Trench ===
The Hjort Trench is the southernmost portion of the Macquarie Ridge complex and has been identified as an oceanic-oceanic subduction zone. This trench is found in a region of diagonal convergence produced by the transform fault evolution of the Emerald Fracture Zone. Due to these transpressive plate movements this trench has frequent seismic events generally less than 20 km depth, which suggest underthrusting of the Indo-Australian plate underneath the Pacific plate. This region of underthrusting may eventually evolve into a self-sustaining subduction zone, though the Hjort Trench is thought to be an example of an oceanic subduction zone initiated in response to transform fault development.

== Studies of the Macquarie triple junction ==
The understanding of the Macquarie triple junction is primarily due to the study of the seismicity, gravitational, magnetic and bathymetric data of the region. Initial studies took place during the early 1970s by the Eltanin Cruises, which took bathymetric and magnetic tracks in order to interpret the general sea floor topography and sea-floor spreading rates. Additional surveys have been taken during 1988–1991 by multiple cruises of the OGS-Explora. These surveys consist of approximately 6300 km the regions seismicity, gravitational signatures, and additional magnetic and bathymetric surveys, significantly contributing to the understanding of the Macquarie triple junction. From analysis of the data obtained from the OGS-Explora, a major change in the Pacific-Antarctic plate motion has been interpreted, instigating the compressional region of the Macquarie Ridge. High-resolution bathymetric and magnetic data were acquired by R/V Araon and M/V L’Astrolabe cruises along the axis of the two easternmost Southeast Indian Ridge segments which by 2017 had confirmed the recent existence of a Macquire microplate. In 2017 and 2019 R/V Explora and R/V Laura Bassi undertook multibeam and magnetic surveys focused on the three plate boundaries meeting at the Macquarie triple junction.

== Overview of relevant plate boundaries ==
=== Australian plate and Antarctic plate boundary ===
The Australian plate (or Indo-Australian plate) and Antarctic plate boundary is an active divergent boundary known as the Southeast Indian Ridge. The Southeast Indian Ridge ranges approximately 2000 kilometers across the southern region of the Indian Ocean. The Southeast Indian Ridge has a complex driving force which is due to the interaction of the Amsterdam-St. Paul Plateau, a developed hot spot in the western portion of the Southeast Indian Ridge, and the mid-oceanic ridge (MOR). The Amsterdam-St. Paul Plateau along with the Southeast Indian Ridge produce new oceanic crust further separating the Indo-Australian and Antarctic plates at an intermediate tectonic rate of 65 mm/yr.

=== Pacific plate and Antarctic plate boundary ===
The Pacific–Antarctic plate boundary is another active divergent boundary known as the Pacific–Antarctic Ridge (PAR). The Pacific–Antarctic Ridge is the southwest region of the East Pacific Rise, the mid-oceanic ridge located at the base of the Pacific Ocean. The PAR is divergent boundary driven by the interaction of a MOR and deep mantle plumes located in the eastern portion of the East Pacific Rise. These deep mantle plumes however, have given the Pacific plate a left lateral force vector creating a transform boundary in the western Pacific–Antarctic plate boundary in the vicinity of the Macquarie triple junction, forming the Emerald Fracture Zone.

=== Australian plate and Pacific plate boundary ===
The Australian plate (previous to 3 million years ago the Indo-Australian plate) and Pacific plate boundary is the most complex boundary of the Macquarie triple junction region, due to the unique collision of the two plates creating two convergent boundaries separated by a transform boundary. There is increasing evidence that the last 6.4 million years of this evolution at the triple junction has been associated with the creation of a separate microplate, the Macquarie plate. The assumption in models of this microplate's existence not only allows a much better fit to historic data relevant to the triple junction, it fits with more recent data for what was an understudied area at the time this triple junction's evolution was first studied.

The Puysegur Trench, which includes the Fjord Trench, is the southern region of the boundary closest to the Macquarie triple junction. The Puysegur Trench formed as the Australian plate subducted beneath the Pacific plate. The Puysegur Trench ranges approximately 800 kilometers in length, from the most southern tip of the New Zealand Islands to the Macquarie triple junction. The Puysegur Trench makes contact with the Macquarie Fault Zone, which is associated with the Alpine Fault. The Alpine Fault is the right-lateral transform fault boundary separating the Puysegur Trench and the northern Kermadec Trench. The Alpine Fault runs through the majority of the southern island of New Zealand and is associated with New Zealand's frequent and intense earthquake history. The last major region of the Australian–Pacific plate boundary is the Kermadec–Tonga subduction zone at which the Pacific plate is subducted beneath the Australian plate, in opposition of the Puysegur Trench. This convergent boundary has a rate of subduction of approximately 5.5-7.4 cm/yr.
