= Australian plate =

Major tectonic plate

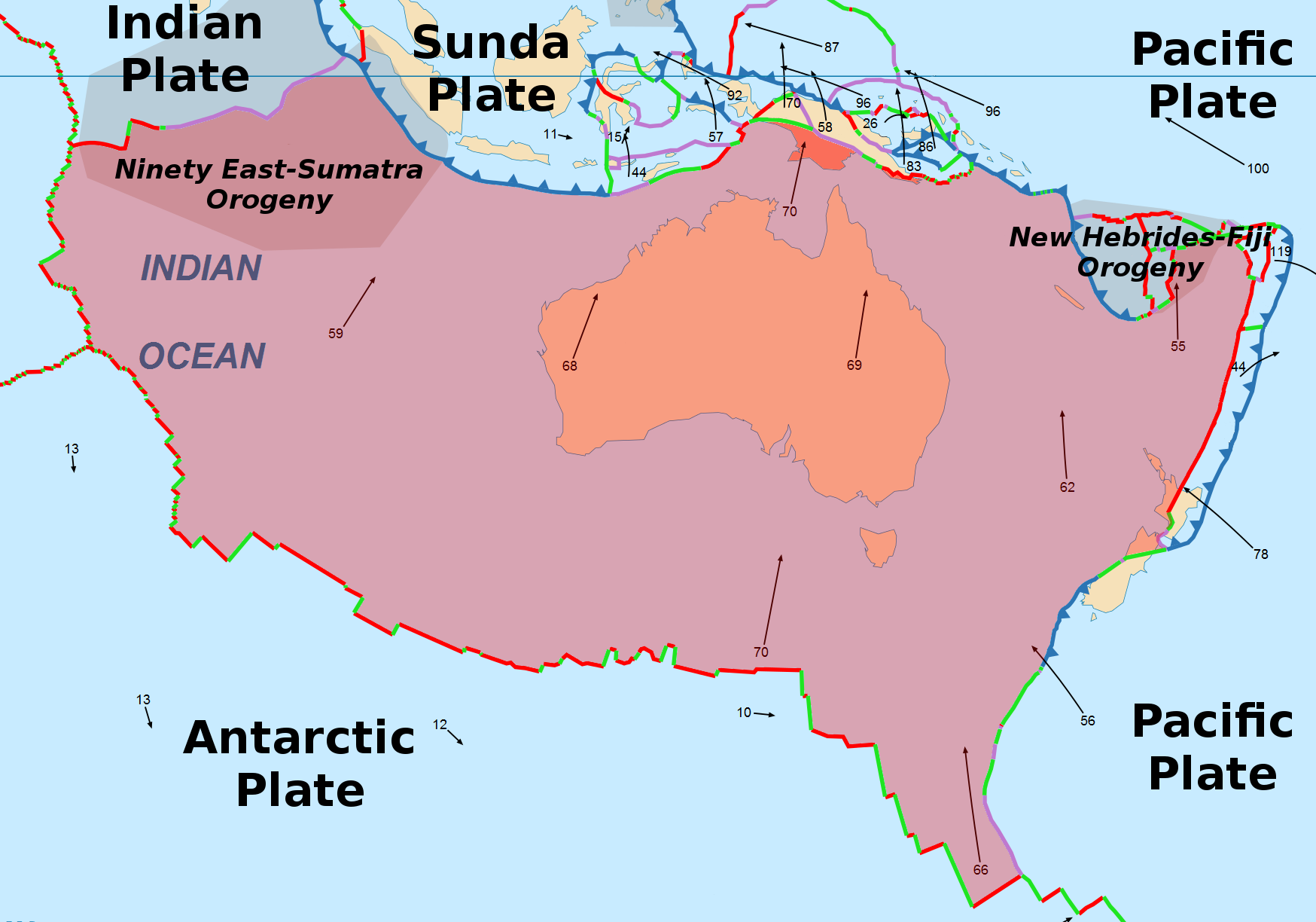
- Type: Major
- Approximate area: 47,000,000 km^{2} (18,000,000 sq mi)
- Movement^{1}: northeast
- Speed^{1}: 62–70 mm/year
- Features: Australia, New Guinea, New Zealand, Indian Ocean
- ^{1}Relative to the African plate

The Australian plate is or was a major tectonic plate in the Eastern Hemisphere and, largely, Southern Hemisphere. Originally a part of the ancient continent of Gondwana, Australia remained connected to India and Antarctica until approximately 100 million years ago when India broke away and began moving north. Australia and Antarctica had begun rifting by 96 million years ago and completely separated a while after this, some estimates suggest as recently as 45 million years ago, though the general consensus remains that this had occurred by 60 million years ago.

The Australian plate later fused with the adjacent Indian plate beneath the Indian Ocean to form a single Indo-Australian plate. However, recent studies suggest that the two plates may have once again split apart and have been separate plates for at least 3 million years. The Australian plate includes the continent of Australia, including Tasmania, as well as portions of New Guinea, New Zealand and the Indian Ocean basin.

== Scope ==
The continental crust of this plate covers the whole of Australia, the Gulf of Carpentaria, southern New Guinea, the Arafura Sea, the Coral Sea. The continental crust also includes northwestern New Zealand, New Caledonia and Fiji. The oceanic crust includes the southeast Indian Ocean, the Tasman Sea, and the Timor Sea. The Australian plate is bordered (clockwise) by the Eurasian plate, the Philippine plate, the Pacific plate, the Antarctic plate, the African plate and the Indian plate. It is however known from movement studies that this definition of the Australian plate is 20% less accurate than one that assumes independently moving Capricorn, and Macquarie microplates.

== Geography ==
The northeasterly side is a complex but generally convergent boundary with the Pacific plate. The Pacific plate is subducting under the Australian plate, which forms the Tonga and Kermadec Trenches, and the parallel Tonga and Kermadec island arcs. It has also uplifted the eastern parts of New Zealand's North Island.

The continent of Zealandia, which separated from Australia 85 million years ago and stretches from New Caledonia in the north to New Zealand's subantarctic islands in the south, is now being torn apart along the transform boundary marked by the Alpine Fault.

South of New Zealand the boundary becomes a transitional transform-convergent boundary, the Macquarie fault zone, where the Australian plate is beginning to subduct under the Pacific plate along the Puysegur Trench. Extending southwest of this trench is the Macquarie Ridge.

The southerly side is a divergent boundary with the Antarctic plate called the Southeast Indian Ridge (SEIR).

The subducting boundary through Indonesia is not parallel to the biogeographical Wallace line that separates the indigenous fauna of Asia from that of Australasia. The eastern islands of Indonesia lie mainly on the Eurasian plate, but have Australasian-related fauna and flora. Southeasterly lies the Sunda Shelf.

To the east of Indonesia there appears to be under the Indian Ocean a deformation zone between the Indian and Australian plates with both earthquake and global satellite navigation system data indicating that India and Australia are not moving on the same vectors northward and have started a process of again separating. This zone is along the northern Ninety East Ridge which implies this area presently is weaker tectonically than the area where originally the Indian and Australian plates merged which is believed to have been further to the north west. There is also deformation in an approximately 1,200 km (750 mi) zone north of the Southeast Indian Ridge between the Australian plate and the proposed Capricorn plate.

== Origins ==
It is known that the Eastern Pilbara Craton within present day Western Australia, contains some of the oldest surface rocks on earth being pristine crust up to 3.8 billion years ago. Accordingly, the Pilbara Craton continues to be studied for clues as to the commencement and subsequent course of plate tectonics.

Depositional age of the Mount Barren Group on the southern margin of the Yilgarn craton and zircon provenance analysis support the hypothesis that collisions between the Pilbara–Yilgarn and Yilgarn–Gawler Cratons assembled a proto-Australian continent approximately 1,696 million years ago (Dawson et al. 2002).

Australia and East Antarctica were merged with Gondwana between 570 and 530 million years ago starting in the Ediacaran (South African Kuunga Orogeny).

As a separate plate, the Australian plate came into being on the breakup of Gondwana with final separation from what is now the Antarctic plate and Zealandia starting in the Early Cretaceous between about 132 million years ago and finishing in the Cenomanian at about 96 million years ago. The separation continued with various authors modelling full separation time based on sea levels and/or biological separation. A currently widely used reference model for plate movement has total separation of Tasmania by 60 million years ago although some had argued historically that this was as recent as 45 million years ago.

== Speed ==
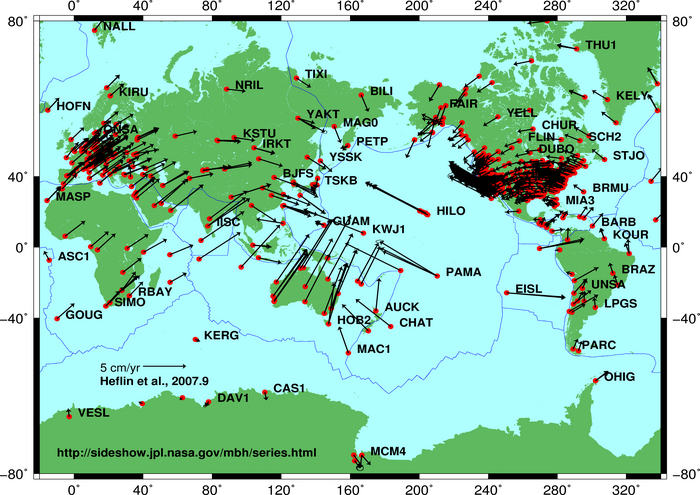
Global plate tectonic movement as measured by GPS devices.

The Australian plate, which Australia is on, is moving faster than other plates. The Australian plate is moving about 6.9 cm (2.7 inches) a year in a northward direction and with a small clockwise rotation. The Global Positioning System must be updated due to the movement, as some locations move faster.

Technically movement is a vector and requires to be related to something. Much of the work involved in determining these plate vectors involves assurance that the points of reference are representative of the plates they are on, as distortion will be likely in areas of tectonic activity. Further assumptions such as there are only 8 plates were made in earlier modelling when as many as 52 may exist, with independent movement, although fair accuracy for larger plate movement can be obtained if only 25 are modelled.

In terms of the middle of India and Australia landmasses, with Australia as the point of reference, presently Australia is moving northward at 3 cm (1.2 in) per year with respect to India consistent with a zone of deformation between the two plates as commented upon earlier. This zone of deformation may actually presently involve some of India.

The northwards collision of the Australian plate with the Sunda plate (Sundaland plate, previously classified as part of Eurasian plate) has a maximum convergence velocity of 7.3 cm (2.9 in) per year ± 0.8 cm (0.31 in) per year at the Java Trench decreasing to 6.0 cm (2.4 in) ± 0.04 cm (0.016 in) per year at the southern Sumatra Trench.

The eastern collision with the Pacific plate has increasing displacement rates towards the north from a low of less than 0.2 cm (0.079 in) per year at the southern end of the Macquarie fault zone, where there is the major plate triple junction with the Pacific and Antarctic plates. Due to vector complexities at the north eastern end of this collision, which includes several spreading centres, it is perhaps simplest to state that the average displacement rate to the north is about half that of the collision with the Sunda plate, but this would not explain some of the largest and most destructive recent earthquakes and eruptions on the face of the planet.

There is oblique convergence of what are now the Pacific and Australian plates at about 11 cm/year (4.3 in/year) near eastern Papua New Guinea. This has resulted in shear complexities, resolved by the formation of multiple microplates and convergence velocity that varies between 2–48 cm/year (0.79–18.90 in/year) where the Solomon Sea plate subducts under the South Bismarck plate and Pacific plate at the New Britain subduction zone. To the south of this there is sea floor spreading between the Australian plate and the Woodlark plate in the Woodlark Basin while the subduction of the oceanic crust of the Australian plate occurs to the south east in the New Hebrides Trench of the Vanuatu subduction zone under the New Hebrides plate. As we go south the convergence rate falls from 17 cm/year (6.7 in/year) north of the Torres Islands to 4 cm/year (1.6 in/year) in the central section of the trench, to rise again to 12 cm/year (4.7 in/year) in the south.

Very active spreading then resumes in the North Fiji Basin where the edge of the Australian plate makes a transition in a bend up towards the north-east via the transform faults of the Hunter fracture zone to Fiji. The Australian plate interacts at the southern and south-eastern border of the North Fiji Basin with the microplates of the New Hebrides already mentioned, as well as with the Conway Reef plate and the Balmoral Reef plates. To the west of Fiji the Australian plate interacts in the spreading centre of the Lau Basin with the Niuafo'ou plate and the clockwise rotating Tonga plate under which the Pacific plate is subducting in the Kermadec-Tonga subduction zone. The back arc spreading in the Lau Basin continues almost due south in the line of interaction between the Australian and Tonga plates to the Kermadec plate and on to New Zealand where direct interaction resumes with the Pacific plate south of the Taupō Volcanic Zone and such direct interaction continues into the Macquarie fault zone to the south of New Zealand. There is up to 9.6 cm (3.8 in) per year motion accommodated with complex rotational components in the collision dynamics between the north eastern Australian plate and the rotating Tonga plate, the long thin Kermadec plate and the south western aspects of the Pacific plate. The Pacific plate east to west convergence rates along the subduction systems with the Kermadec plate, which are perhaps simpler to state, are among the fastest on Earth, being 8 cm (3.1 in) per year in the north and 4.5 cm (1.8 in) per year in the south.

At the central Alpine Fault in New Zealand the subduction component of the Pacific plate moving westward is about 3.9 cm (1.5 in) per year. The Australian plate then to the south starts subducting under the Pacific plate at a rate of 3.6 cm/year (1.4 in/year) at the Puysegur Trench, which ends in the south as a long series of transform faults between the two plates called the Macquarie Ridge Complex, commencing with the McDougall fault zone and ending with the Macquarie fault zone. The south western portion of the zone has the Pacific plate interacting with an area of the Australian plate that the latest tectonic models suggest is still independent from when it first achieved independent rotation to the then Indo-Australian plate several million years ago, the Macquarie microplate.

Data from the 11,800 km (7,300 mi) long Southeast Indian Ridge only became available after about 1985 and this gives a fairly consistent spreading rate between the Antarctic and Australian plates of 6 cm (2.4 in) per year at a heading of 80° (slightly north of due east, at the Amsterdam transform fault to the south western side of Australian plate), 7 cm (2.8 in) per year with heading 120° (southeast) and 6.6 cm (2.6 in) per year near the Macquarie triple junction which is the south eastern side of the Australian plate.

The Capricorn plate at the western side of the Australian plate is moving at 1.9 mm (0.075 in) per year ± 0.5 mm (0.020 in) per year with heading 45° (northwest) relative to the Australia plate.

== See also ==
- List of earthquakes in Australia
- List of earthquakes in India
- List of earthquakes in Indonesia
- List of earthquakes in New Zealand
- List of earthquakes in Papua New Guinea
- List of earthquakes in Samoa
- List of earthquakes in Tonga
- List of earthquakes in Vanuatu
- Sunda plate – Tectonic plate including Southeast Asia
- Indo-Australian plate
- Indian plate
