= Broken Ridge =

Oceanic plateau in the Indian Ocean

Coordinates: 31°S 95°E

Broken Ridge (Indian Ocean)

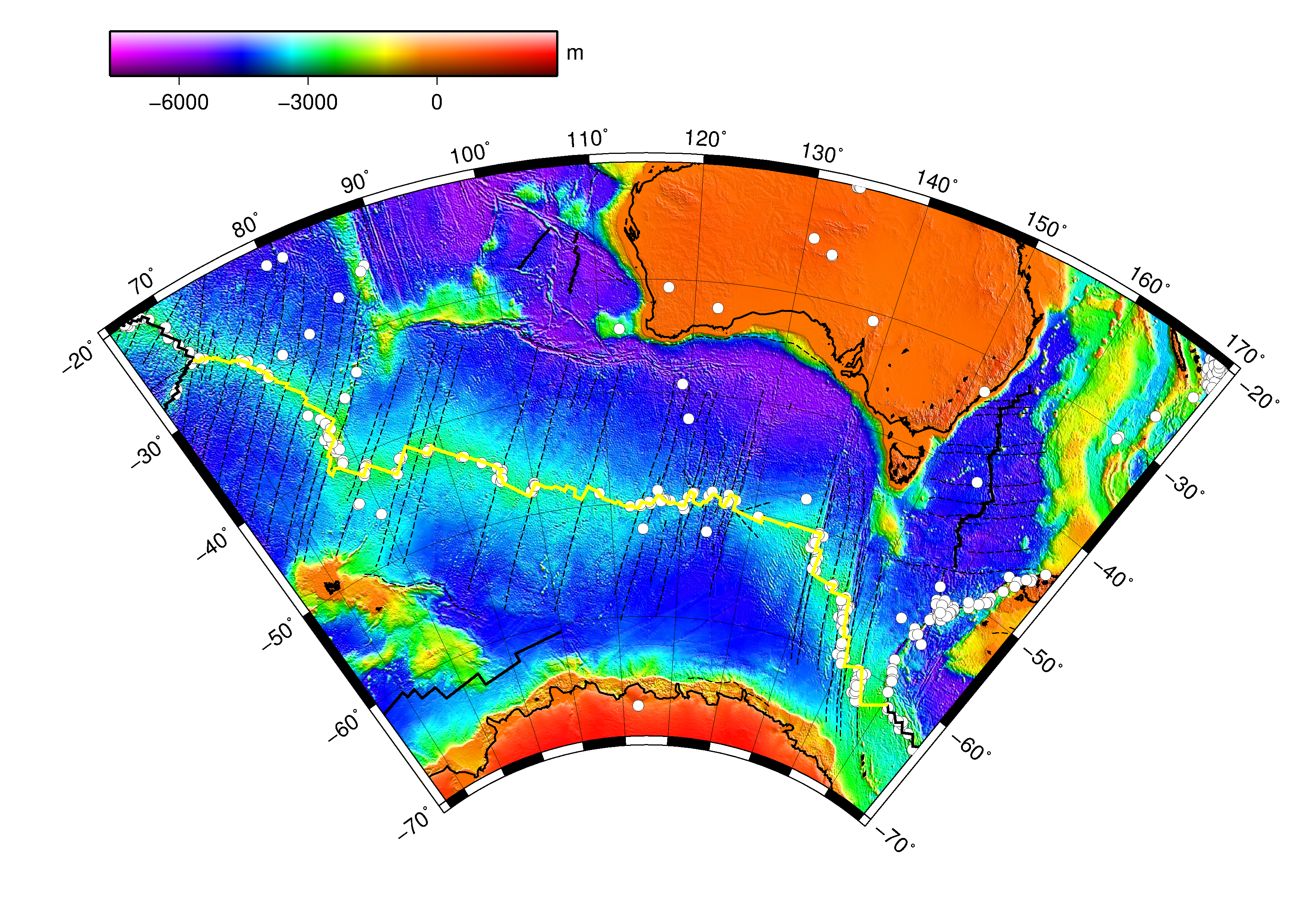
Map of the Southeast Indian Ridge. The Broken Ridge is the green area in the upper left corner.

The Broken Ridge or Broken Plateau is an oceanic plateau in the south-eastern Indian Ocean. The Broken Ridge once formed a large igneous province (LIP) together with the Kerguelen Plateau. When Australia and Antarctica started to separate, the Broken Ridge and the Kerguelen Plateau got separated by the Southeast Indian Ridge. Alkalic basalt from the Broken Ridge has been dated to 95 Ma.

The Broken Ridge stretches 1,200 km (750 mi) from the southern end of the Ninety East Ridge towards the south-western corner of Australia. It is up to 400 km (250 mi) wide and reaches 1,000 m (3,300 ft) below sea level. It is separated from the Diamantina fracture zone on its southern side by a 3,000 m (9,800 ft) escarpment, while on the northern side the ridge slopes gently towards the abyssal Wharton Basin. The sediment cover on the ridge reaches 800 m (2,600 ft) and the Moho is found at about 20 km (12 mi). It is separated from the Naturaliste Plateau by the Dirck Hartog Ridge.

The Kerguelen LIP covered 2.3×10^{6} km^{2} (0.89×10^{6} sq mi) making it the second largest LIP on Earth (after the Ontong Java Plateau in the Pacific). Both these enormous LIPs reaches 2–4 km (1.2–2.5 mi) above the surrounding ocean floor and have a crustal thickness of 20–40 km (12–25 mi) (compared to oceanic crust typically around 7 km (4.3 mi) thick.) The Broken Ridge and Kerguelen Plateau are now separated by 1,800 km (1,100 mi). When they broke up, the southern flank of Broken Ridge was uplifted some 2,000 m (6,600 ft) and reached above sea level.

The Kerguelen LIP has a long and complicated history, however, and is probably the least "typical" of all LIPs. Rocks from both the Broken Ridge and the Kerguelen Plateau contain a continental component or "fingerprint". In the Early Cretaceous, the Kerguelen hotspot was split into several diapirs of various sizes, composition, and ascent rates. These separate diapirs created the Bunbury Basalt, the Southern Kerguelen Plateau, the Rajmahal Traps/Indian lamprophyres, Antarctic lamprophyres, and the Central Kerguelen Plateau/Broken Ridge. In the late Cretaceous, activity in the mantle slowed and the Kerguelen hotspot was reduced to a single plume which created the Ninety East Ridge. 120–95 Ma when the Southern and Central Kerguelen Plateau formed together with the Broken Ridge, the Kerguelen hotspot produced 1 km^{3} (0.24 cu mi)/year, but 95–25 Ma the output decreased to 0.1 km^{3} (0.024 cu mi).
