= Diamantina fracture zone =

Escarpment, separating two oceanic plateaus in the southeast Indian Ocean

Diamantina fracture zone marked in red

The Diamantina fracture zone (DFZ, Diamantina zone) is an area of the south-eastern Indian Ocean seafloor, consisting of a range of ridges and trenches. It lies to the south of the mideastern Indian Ocean features of the Wharton Basin and Perth Basin, and to the south west of the Naturaliste Plateau.

Scientists discovered a "whale necropolis" in the Diamantina fracture zone that includes both modern and fossil whale-fall groupings, which have been collecting in the area for at least 5.3 million years.

== Escarpment ==
Being parallel to the Southeast Indian Ridge, the Diamantina fracture zone is not a true fracture zone in the sense used in plate tectonics, and includes an escarpment, separating two oceanic plateaus, being the southern border of the Broken Ridge Plateau. Its extension to the west is called the Diamantina Escarpment and the trench to the east of the escarpment the Diamantina Trench. All these features are mirrored by corresponding topography on the other side of the Southeast Indian Ridge. The Broken Ridge Plateau has separated at the ridge from the Kerguelen Plateau and these were components of the Earth's second largest characterised large igneous province by volume. This formed between 136 and 124 million years ago and covered more than 244,000 km^{2} (94,000 sq mi).

== Exploration ==
The Diamantina fracture zone was first detected by RV Vema and RV Argo in 1960. It is named after HMAS Diamantina (K377), which conducted further exploration in 1961. Professor Alan Jamieson from The University of Western Australia led a scientific expedition to the eastern margin of the DFZ, which enters the southwest corner of the Australian exclusive economic zone. Professor Jamieson's team deployed baited landers beyond 6,000 m (20,000 ft) water depth aiming to document the biodiversity and geology of the region. Two hadal snailfish were captured during this voyage at 6,177 m (20,266 ft), both of which are believed to be new species.

In 2023, the Chinese research vessel Tan Suo Yi Hao, using the HOV Fendouzhe, identified what was later described as the deepest and most extensive known whale graveyard within the Diamantina Fracture Zone. Located around the Dordrecht Deep and at depths exceeding 7,000 metres (23,000 ft), the site contained 476 fossil cetacean localities, numerous modern whale remains, and evidence that whale falls have accumulated there for at least 5.3 million years, including fossils representing a previously unknown species.

== Bathymetry ==
Diamantina bathymetry

The first high-resolution multibeam bathymetry of the central DFZ was collected between June 2014 and June 2016, for the purpose of searching for Malaysia Airlines Flight 370 (MH370), which disappeared on 8 March 2014. This revealed that the DFZ has a depth of more than 5,800 m (19,000 ft). Later research using multibeam bathymetry data available from Geoscience Australia and the GMRT (Global Multi-Resolution Topography) Synthesis, infilled with data derived from the GEBCO_2014 global bathymetry dataset, suggested that the deepest point in the fracture zone would be at 33.452°S 101.468°E in the Dordrecht Deep, within the axis of the fracture zone, with a maximum water depth of between 7,090 to 7,100 metres (23,260 to 23,290 ft).

Based on this research, it was suggested that the Dordrecht Deep within the DFZ in the southeast Indian Ocean, and the Sunda Trench in the eastern Indian Ocean (~11.2°S 118.5°E), are the two candidates for the deepest points in the Indian Ocean.

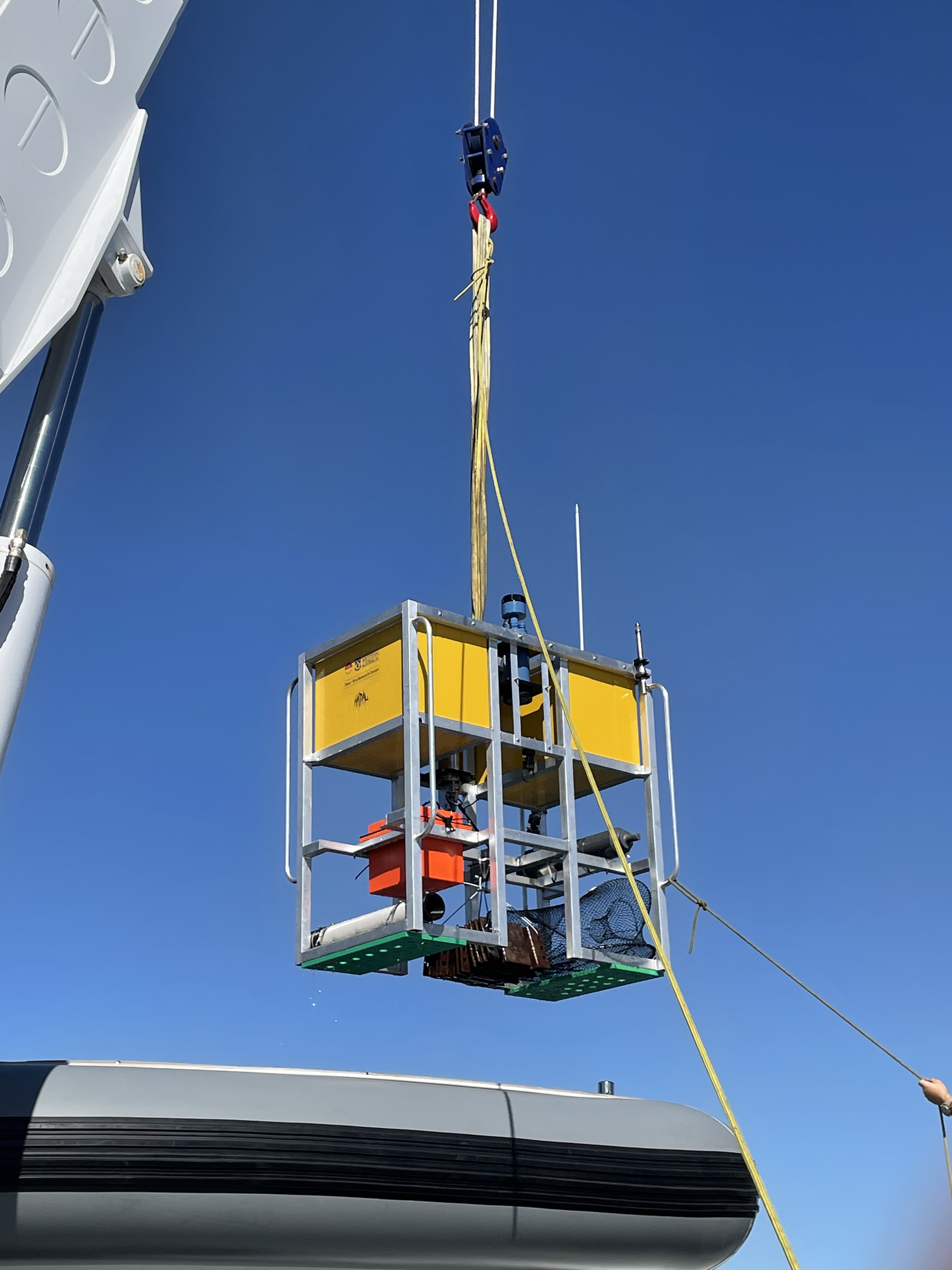
One of the three full ocean depth rated landers used by the Minderoo-UWA Deep-Sea Research Centre.

To resolve this debate, the Diamantina fracture zone was surveyed by the Five Deeps Expedition in March 2019 by the Deep Submersible Support Vessel DSSV Pressure Drop, equipped with a full-ocean depth Kongsberg SIMRAD EM124 multibeam echosounder system. Using this echosounder and direct measurement by a Benthic lander, a maximum water depth of 7,019 m (23,028 ft) m ±17 m (56 ft) was measured for the Dordrecht Deep, at 33.631°S 101.356°E, 167 m (548 ft) deeper than and ~30 km (19 mi) southwest of the Stewart and Jamieson (2019) GEBCO_14-derived location. This confirmed that the Diamantina fracture zone does not contain the deepest point in the Indian Ocean, but may be the second deepest point after the Sunda Trench.

The shallowest point in the area is the 1,125 m (3,691 ft) point in the Broken Ridge, close to Ninety East Ridge.

== See also ==
- Oceanic trench
- Sunda Arc
