= Viaud Ridge =

Indian Ocean undersea mountain range

- Location within Indian Ocean

Highest point
- Elevation: −2,300 m (−7,500 ft)
- Coordinates: 2°N 76°E

Dimensions
- Length: 15–25 km (9.3–15.5 mi)

Naming
- Etymology: Gustave Viaud

Geography
- Location: Indian Ocean; Laccadive Sea

Viaud Ridge is an undersea mountain range in the Indian Ocean located south of India, southwest of Sri Lanka and east of the Maldives. Its morphology remains poorly defined: estimates range from between 15 and 25 kilometers long, peaking at about 1,700 meters above the ocean floor. Discovered in 1970, it was only named in 1993 in honor of the brother of the French writer Pierre Loti, Gustave Viaud, a naval surgeon and the first photographer of Tahiti who died and was immersed in the area in 1865.

== Geography ==
Viaud Ridge is an underwater mountain range in the Indian Ocean located in the Laccadive Sea. The neighbouring land masses are Sri Lanka, with the capital Colombo 650 kilometers to the north-north-east, the southern tip of India to the north and the Maldives to the west, at the latitude of Addu Atoll.

Viaud Ridge rises above the oceanic depression of the Central Indian Basin, an abyssal plain of the Indian Ocean inscribed between the Indian subcontinent to the north and northwest, the Central Indian Ridge to the west, the Southeast Indian Ridge to the south, and the Ninety East Ridge to the east. It is 15 to 25 kilometers long and has a maximum prominence of about 1,700 meters. The seabed is 4,000 to 5,000 meters deep in this area of the Central Indian Basin, so the highest point of Viaud Ridge is between 3,300 and 2,300 meters below sea level.

Discovered in 1970 by various ships passing through this sector of the Indian Ocean, the submarine chain was still poorly defined in 2008, leading it to be listed at a General Bathymetric Chart of the Oceans summit held that year in Jeju, South Korea, as one of 183 underwater features requiring more precise geographic coordinates. According to GEBCO and VLIZ Marine Gazetteer, it is located between 1°18′N 75°45′E and 2°27′N 77°24′E longitude, but French researcher Alain Quella-Villégier also gives its maximum latitude as 1°42′N.

== Toponymy ==
Viaud Ridge was named after a suggestion made in approximately April or May 1993 by Robert Fisher, a professor at the University of California, San Diego campus and part of the Scripps Institution of Oceanography in La Jolla. His proposal, validated in May 1993 by the GEBCO sub-committee on toponyms of underwater features, honours the Frenchman Gustave Viaud, elder brother of the writer Pierre Loti, whom he interacted with on some occasions. Viaud was a naval surgeon, explorer and the first photographer of Tahiti. He died and was immersed in the area. Exhausted by fatigue and cholera, which he had contracted in Côn Đảo Prison, he died at sea on 10 March 1865 while his ship, the Alphée was in the Bay of Bengal; the next day, his body was released into the sea, at 6°11′N 84°48′E.

== See also ==
- Seamount
