= Dordrecht Deep =

Part of the Diamantina Trench southwest of Perth, Western Australia

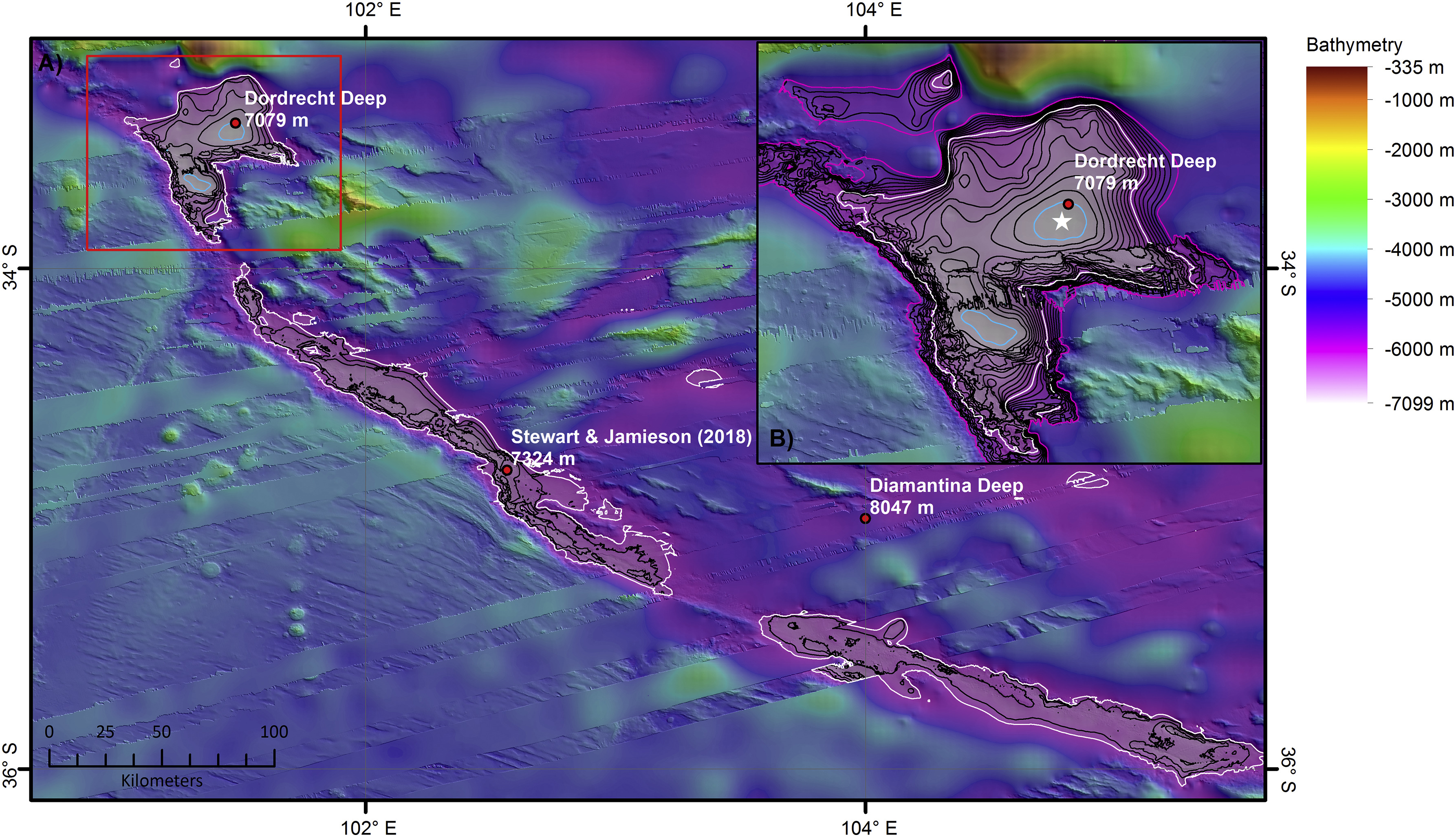
2019 bathymetry Diamantina Trench

The Dordrecht Deep is located in the Diamantina Trench southwest of Perth, Western Australia. The Diamantina Trench is in the eastern part of the larger Diamantina fracture zone, which stretches 1,900 kilometres (1,200 mi) from the Ninety East Ridge to the Naturaliste Plateau, off the lower part of Southwest Australia. It is one of the deepest points (surpassed by the Sunda Trench) in the Indian Ocean at 7,079 m (23,225 ft). It is located about 1,125 kilometres (699 mi) west-southwest of Perth at 35°S 104°E.

It was discovered in 1960. A subsequent survey in 1961 by the Australian oceanographic survey ship HMAS Diamantina (K377) confirmed the bathymetry and conducted a scientific survey. The trench (and the Fracture Zone) was named after her. Dordrecht was the name of a vessel of the Dutch East India Company, which explored the Australian west coast in 1619 and discovered the Houtman Abrolhos.

== 2019 ultra-deep-sea lander descent ==
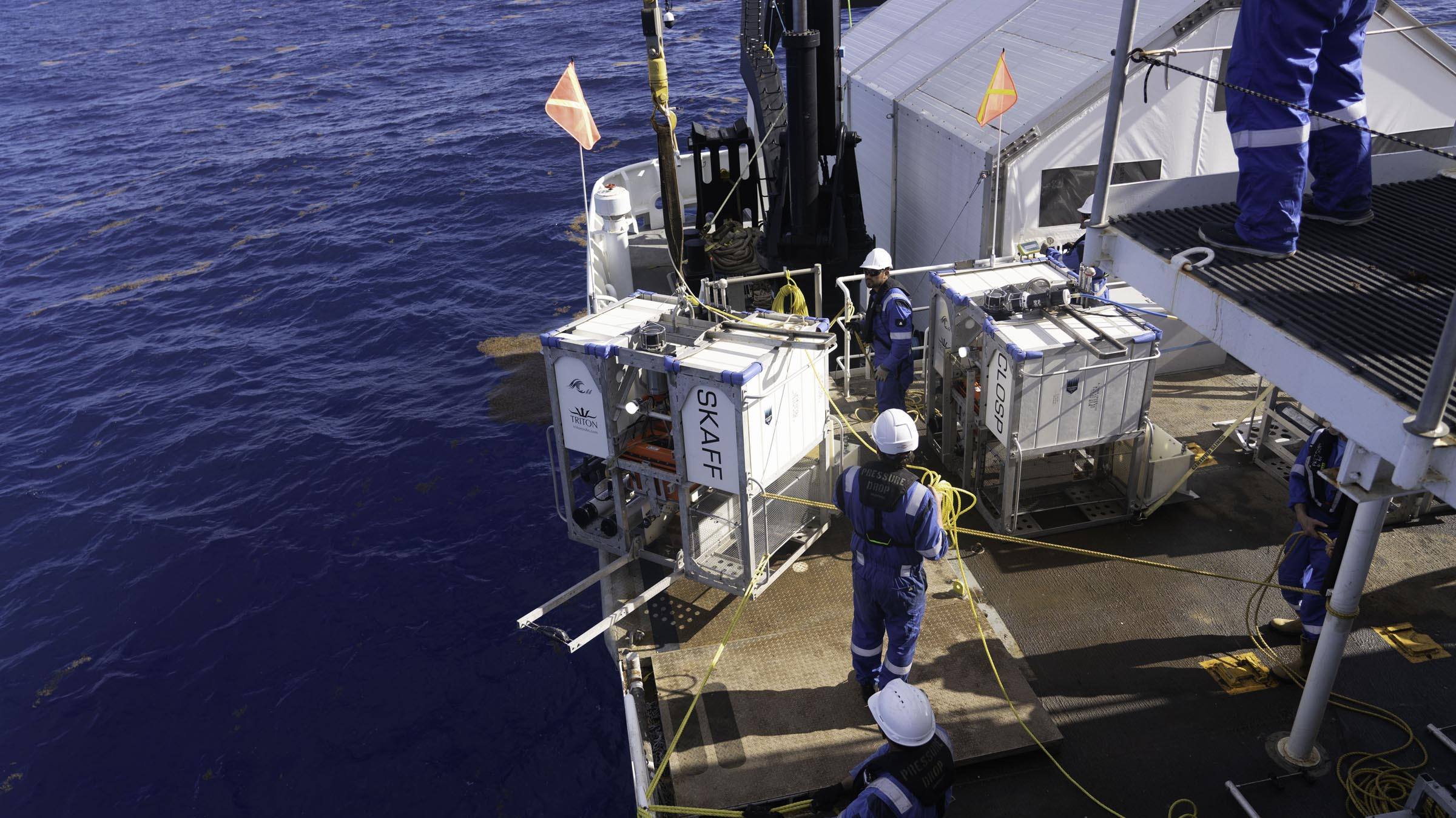
Two of the ultra-deep-sea landers used by the Five Deeps Expedition

To resolve the debate regarding the deepest point of the Indian Ocean, the Diamantina Fracture Zone was surveyed by the Five Deeps Expedition in March 2019 by the Deep Submersible Support Vessel DSSV Pressure Drop, equipped with a Kongsberg SIMRAD EM124 multibeam echosounder system. Using the multibeam echosounder system and direct measurement by an ultra-deep-sea lander a maximum water depth of 7,019 m (23,028 ft) ±17 m (56 ft) at 33°37′52″S 101°21′14″E for the Dordrecht Deep was recorded. This was shallower than previously thought, and confirmed that the Sunda Trench, rather than the Diamantina Fracture Zone, contains the deepest point in the Indian Ocean. The gathered data was donated to the GEBCO Seabed 2030 initiative. The expedition aimed to thoroughly map and visit the deepest points of all five of the world's oceans by the end of September 2019, at which it was successful.

== See also ==
- Sunda Arc
- Oceanic trench
