= Aptian extinction =

Extinction event during the Aptian stage

The Aptian extinction event (AEE) was an extinction event that occurred during the Aptian stage of the early Cretaceous Period around 116 or 117 million years ago. It has sometimes been termed the mid-Aptian extinction event. It is classified as a minor extinction event, rather than a major event like the famous Cretaceous–Paleogene extinction event that brought about the end of the Mesozoic Era.

== Causes ==
The Aptian event may have been causally connected with the Rahjamal Traps volcanism episode in the Bengal region of India, associated with the Kerguelen hotspot of volcanic activity. During this time, India was located in the southern Indian Ocean and plate tectonics had not yet moved the Indian landmass into its present position.

== Effects ==
The Aptian event is most readily detected among marine deposits rather than terrestrial fossil deposits. From a palaeobotanical perspective, the Aptian Extinction Event is an episode of importance, deserving a higher status among other minor events. Stegosaurs such as Wuerhosaurus, among the last known stegosaurs a dinosaurs, went extinct along with surviving relatives of mammals such as the Tritylodonts.
