= Boomerang Seamount =

Active submarine volcano northeast of Amsterdam Island in the Indian Ocean

- Approximate surface projection of Boomerang Seamount (blue outline). Nearby mantle Bouguer Abnormality has been mapped in red shading to indicate likely current hotspot plume location. Also mapped is approximate outline Amsterdam Saint Paul Plateau (brown), nearby subsurface transform faults (grey), fracture zones (orange), their probable extensions (light orange) and plate boundary (white, in this case the Southeast Indian Ridge) as referred to in text of article.
- Summit depth: 650 m (2,000 ft)
- Height: 1,100 m (3,600 ft)

Location
- Location: Southern Indian Ocean, 18 kilometers northwest of Amsterdam Island
- Coordinates: 37.721°S 77.825°E
- Country: France

Geology
- Type: Submarine volcano
- Last eruption: December 1995

History
- Discovery date: 1996

The Boomerang Seamount is an active submarine volcano, located 18 km (11 mi) northeast of Amsterdam Island, France. It was formed by the Amsterdam-Saint Paul hotspot and has a 2 km (1.2 mi) wide caldera that is 200 m (660 ft) deep. Hydrothermal activity occurs within the caldera. The sampled rocks are basalt and picrite basalt.

== Geology ==
The seamount is located on the mainly undersea Amsterdam–Saint Paul Plateau of the Antarctic Plate, which was predominantly formed by the volcanic hotspot. There is a magma chamber located at between 20–36 km (12–22 mi) depth below the nearby Amsterdam Island. The plateau which extends north west towards the Nieuw Amsterdam Fracture Zone (Amsterdam Fracture Zone) and south to beyond the island of St Paul with its presently known active area being delimited by the St. Paul Fracture Zone, is a 250 by 200 km (160 by 120 mi) feature of the sea floor near the Southeast Indian Ridge, which is an active spreading center between the Antarctic plate that the seamount lies on, and the Australian Plate. Samples recovered were tholeiitic to transitional basalt.

=== Tectonics ===
This tectonically complex area has had detailed study. Helium isotopic compositional studies are consistent with its formation from the combined effects of accretion at the mid-ocean ridge and mantle plume activity of a hot spot. This is either the Kerguelen hotspot or a potentially separate Amsterdam-Saint Paul hotspot but resolution of this issue is complicated, due to it being adjacent to the Southeast Indian Ridge, and the influence of the distant Kerguelen hot spot plume. Recent independent authors have favoured a separate Amsterdam and St. Paul hotspot. There are compositional reasons to suggest that the current Kerguelen hotspot influences the present Southeast Indian Ridge volcanics far to its north but also that the isotopic parameters of basalts of the Amsterdam-Saint Paul hot spot is different from the Kerguelen hot spot. However one sample from Boomberang Seamount, from outside the crater, has a composition that is midway between St Paul Island and Kerguelen Plateau samples and this is consistent with Kerguelen-type source mantle existing beneath Boomerang Seamount. Which ever hot spot is responsible is moving south as Île Amsterdam rocks are older than St. Paul rocks. The Amsterdam–St. Paul Plateau while formed in the last 10 million years, started this formation beneath the Australian Plate so the island is built on the components of two tectonic plates.

== See also ==
- List of volcanoes in French Southern and Antarctic Lands
