= Bruce Spur =

Undersea spur off Antarctica

Coordinates: 63°30′S 101°15′E

Bruce Spur (also known as Banka Brus or Bruce Rise) is an undersea spur off Antarctica. The name was approved by the Advisory Committee for Undersea Features in September 1963.

The Bruce Spur is divided into two distinct segments separated by The north-west trending Bruce Canyon. The eastern rise reach up to 1,500 m (4,900 ft) below sea level and is bounded by steep slopes to the east and north. The western rise reaches 2,000 km (1,200 mi) and is bounded by more gently dipping slopes. The western rise probably formed during the rifting between India and Australia during the Early Cretaceous, while the eastern rise probably formed during the break-up between Australia and Antarctica in the Late Cretaceous.

The western part of the Bruce Spur was conjugate to Gulden Draak Knoll, now located on the western margins of the Perth Abyssal Plain, before the break-up between India, Australia, and Antarctica. Greater India and the Batavia Knoll (north of Gulden Draak) rifted from the Naturaliste Plateau and Gulden Draak rifted from the western Bruce Spur about 127 Ma. Continental rifting continued between the Bruce Spur and the Naturaliste Plateau for some 45 Ma after India broke off together with the two knolls. This rifting ended with onset of seafloor spreading between Australia and Antarctica around 83 Ma.
