= Gustave Viaud =

French photographer and naval surgeon

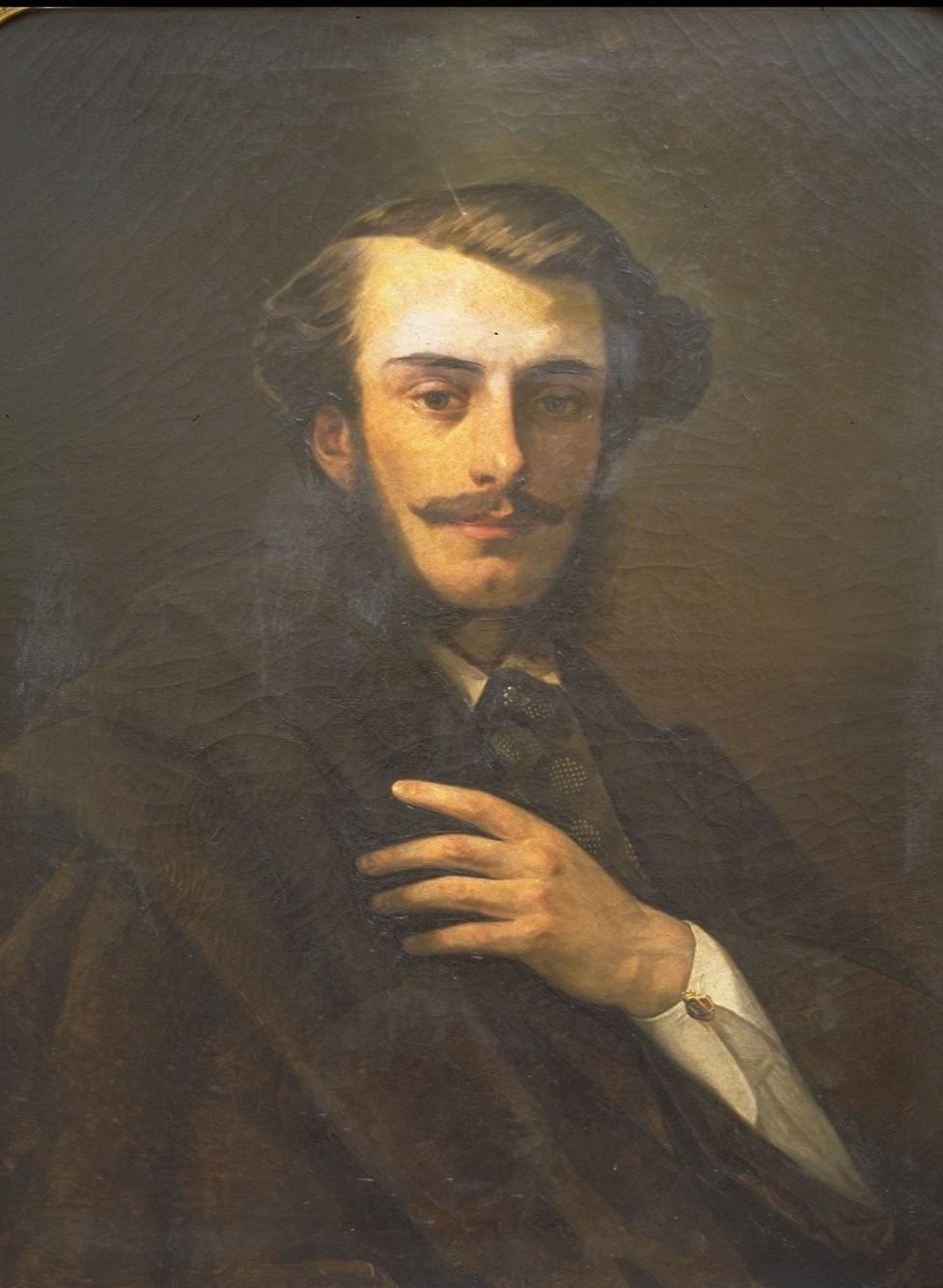
- portrait by Marie Bon
- Born: April 25, 1836; Rochefort, Charente-Maritime
- Died: March 10, 1865 (aged 28) off Ceylon
- Occupation: Naval surgeon
- Known for: The first photographer of Tahiti

Gustave Viaud (April 25, 1836 – March 10, 1865) was a French naval surgeon born in Rochefort, Charente-Maritime on 25 April 1836 and died off Ceylon, present-day Sri Lanka, on 10 March 1865.

== Biography ==
Viaud was the elder brother of the writer Pierre Loti. He arrived in Tahiti in 1859 and worked in Taravao and the nearby islands, becoming the first photographer of Tahiti. Viaud had a camera that required very long exposure times of between 5 and 15 minutes, which forced him to take only landscapes. Gustave Viaud left 25 photographs of Papeete which constitute as many historical documents. He left Tahiti in 1862 before being appointed to Cochinchina.

The International Hydrographic Organization named Viaud Ridge after him in 1993. The ridge is an underwater mountain range in the Indian Ocean, located near where he died and where he was submerged the day after his death.

== Bibliography ==
- Dictionnaire illustré de la Polynésie, 4 vol, Editions de l'Alizé, 1988 (in French)
- Numa Broc, Dictionnaire des Explorateurs français du XIX^{E} siècle, T.4, Océanie, CTHS, 2003, p. 376 (in French)
