= South Indian Basin =

South Indian Basin (60°0′S 120°0′E) is an undersea basin name approved 7/63 (ACUF 12).

It lies between Antarctica and the Southeast Indian Ridge.
