= Kerguelen hotspot =

Hotspot under the Indian Ocean

Coordinates: 49.6°S 68.99°E

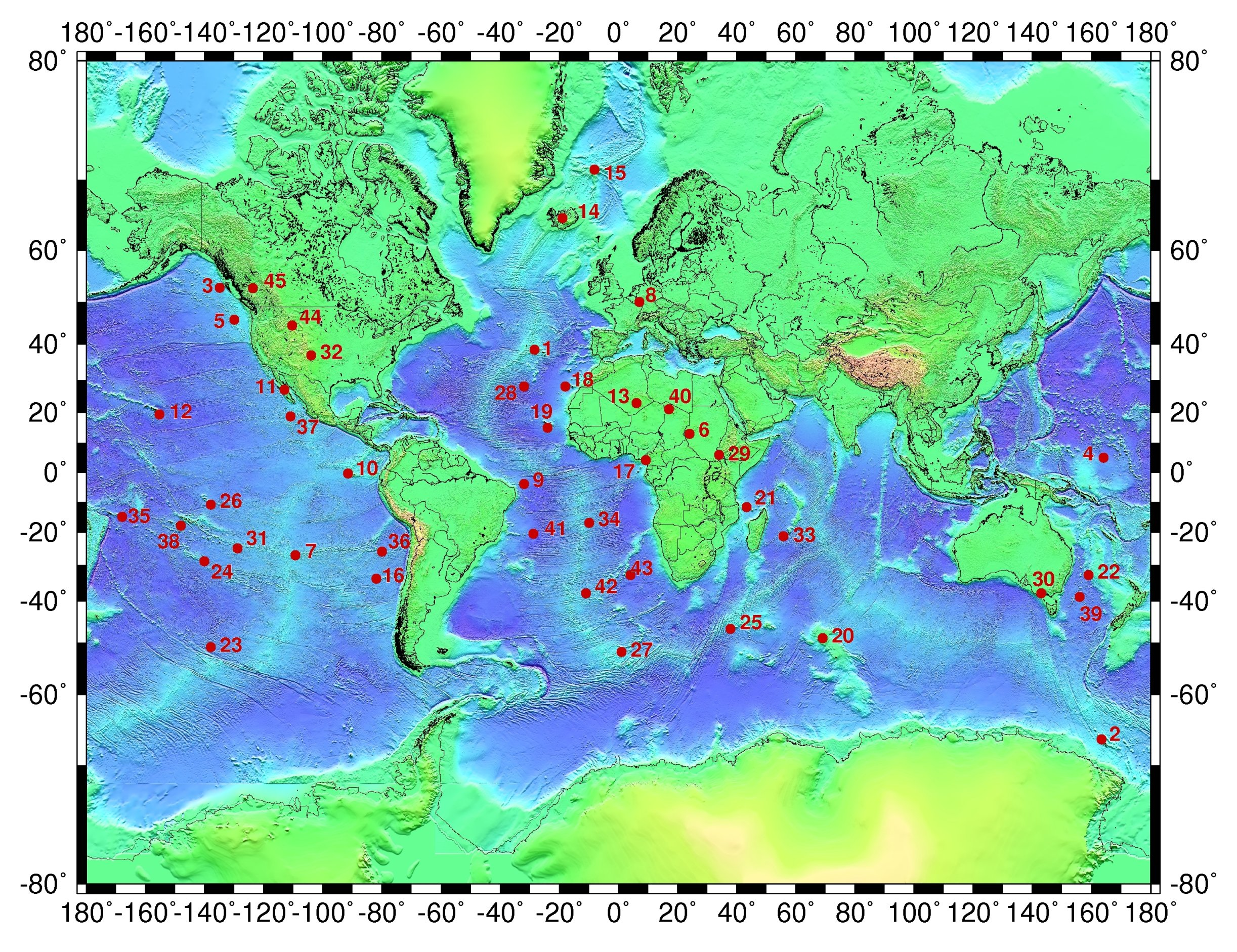
The Kerguelen hotspot is marked 20 on this map.

The Kerguelen hotspot is a volcanic hotspot presently located near the Kerguelen Plateau in the Southern Indian Ocean. The Kerguelen hotspot has produced basaltic lava for about 130 million years and has also produced the Kerguelen Islands, Naturaliste Plateau, Heard Island, the McDonald Islands, the Comei large igneous province in south Tibet, and the Rajmahal Traps. One of the associated features, the Ninety East Ridge, is distinguished by its over 5,000 km (3,100 mi) length, being the longest linear tectonic feature on Earth. The total volume of magma erupted in 130 million years with associated features has been estimated to be about 25,000,000 km^{3} (6,000,000 cu mi). However, as well as large igneous provinces and seamounts the hotspot has interacted with other seafloor spreading features, so this volume figure has some uncertainty.

== Recent volcanism ==
Interactive map of Heard Island and McDonald Island which are the locations of recent surface volcanism associated with the Kerguelen hotspot.

The most recent activity of the Kerguelen hotspot has been near Heard Island and McDonald Islands where there are two active volcanoes, but its current location could be quite a wide area of the Central Kerguelen Plateau extending over a distance of about 440 km (270 mi), back into the Kerguelen Archipelago as there is some current geothermal activity there, with active fumaroles. Some plate tectonic models favour such more north-east locations. The bulk of the Kerguelen Islands alkalic flood basalts were deposited between 30 and 24 million years ago. However younger lavas towards the south east of the archipelago that are mainly found as dykes or plugs in these flood basalts and have ages between 10 and 6 million years. To the south, the stratovolcano of Mont Ross on Grande Terre is between 2 million years and 100,000 years old.

The composition of the 10 million year old Amsterdam–St. Paul Plateau located near the current plate boundary of the Southeast Indian Ridge has similarities to the eruptives of the Kerguelen hotspot so the recently active volcanoes on it have been assigned by some to this hot spot rather than a separate Amsterdam-Saint Paul hotspot. In such a case Île Amsterdam about 1,400 km (870 mi) to the north–east of the Kerguelen Archipelago has a volcano that must have erupted within perhaps the last century, the Boomerang Seamount erupted in 1995 and Île Saint-Paul nearby erupted in 1793.

== Historic volcanism ==
=== Tectonics ===
The Kerguelen hotspot has been used to help interpret the plate tectonic history of the Indo-Australian Plate, even though the hotspot itself is now situated under the Antarctic Plate. Models of major plate dynamics based on the mantle plume hypothesis give a fair fit to observed ages over the last 130 million years but some compositional details are not explained by the classical plume model. It is important to realise in the discussion below that the dates referred to were obtained over a period of about 50 years and those found by earlier work have been updated where appropriate as more samples analysed. This could result in events before about 40 million years ago having corrections of about 10 million years. There is a school of thought that assigns at least two separate hotspots to the activity assigned by some to a single Kerguelen hotspot and this issue is not resolved by the implications of the latest tectonic plate modelling. The potentially separate Amsterdam-Saint Paul hotspot is assigned in such models to explain historic activity at the Amsterdam-Saint Paul Plateau to the south of the Southeast Indian Ridge with this hotspot's previous activity now to the north of the Southeast Indian Ridge being the seamounts of the Chain of the Dead Poets. The current location of this hotspot, if it exists, is hard to determine as there are areas of recent volcanic activity that might be associated with the still spreading Southeast Indian Ridge. Most recent work has two separate hotspots.

One hundred and forty million years ago the present north-eastern aspect of India (Bengal), southern Western Australia and Princess Elizabeth Land portions of Antarctica were adjacent before Gondwana breakup. Initially India and Australia rotated from Antarctica with continental crustal extension between Australia and Antarctica by about 132.5 million years ago. India separated first from Antarctica and this occurred around 132 to 130 million years ago, although earlier work had this happening by 124 million years ago. East Gondwana, comprising present Antarctica, India, and Australia continued to break up between 132.6 to 96 million years ago with India moved north-west from Australia-Antarctica and extension between Australia and Antarctica being at its greatest rate. Seafloor spreading occurred in the area of the present Naturaliste Plateau. India started its collision with Asia about 70 million years ago. Eastern Australia and Antarctica completed their separation between perhaps as recently as 45 million years ago, but with most historic models by 67 million years ago. Recent studies, and evidence from seismic events such as the 2012 Indian Ocean earthquakes, suggest that the Indo-Australian Plate may have broken up into two or three separate plates due primarily to stresses induced by the collision of the Indo-Australian Plate with Eurasia along what later became the Himalayas, and that the Indian Plate and Australian Plate may have been separate since at least 3 million years ago. Much of the area of the Ninety East Ridge as well as being related to the hotspot is part of the diffuse boundary between the Indian Plate and Australian Plate as they go their separate ways toward the north. Present day structures such as the Elan Bank may have their placements due to ridge jumps at propagating rifts during the process of sea floor spreading.

=== Eruptive history ===
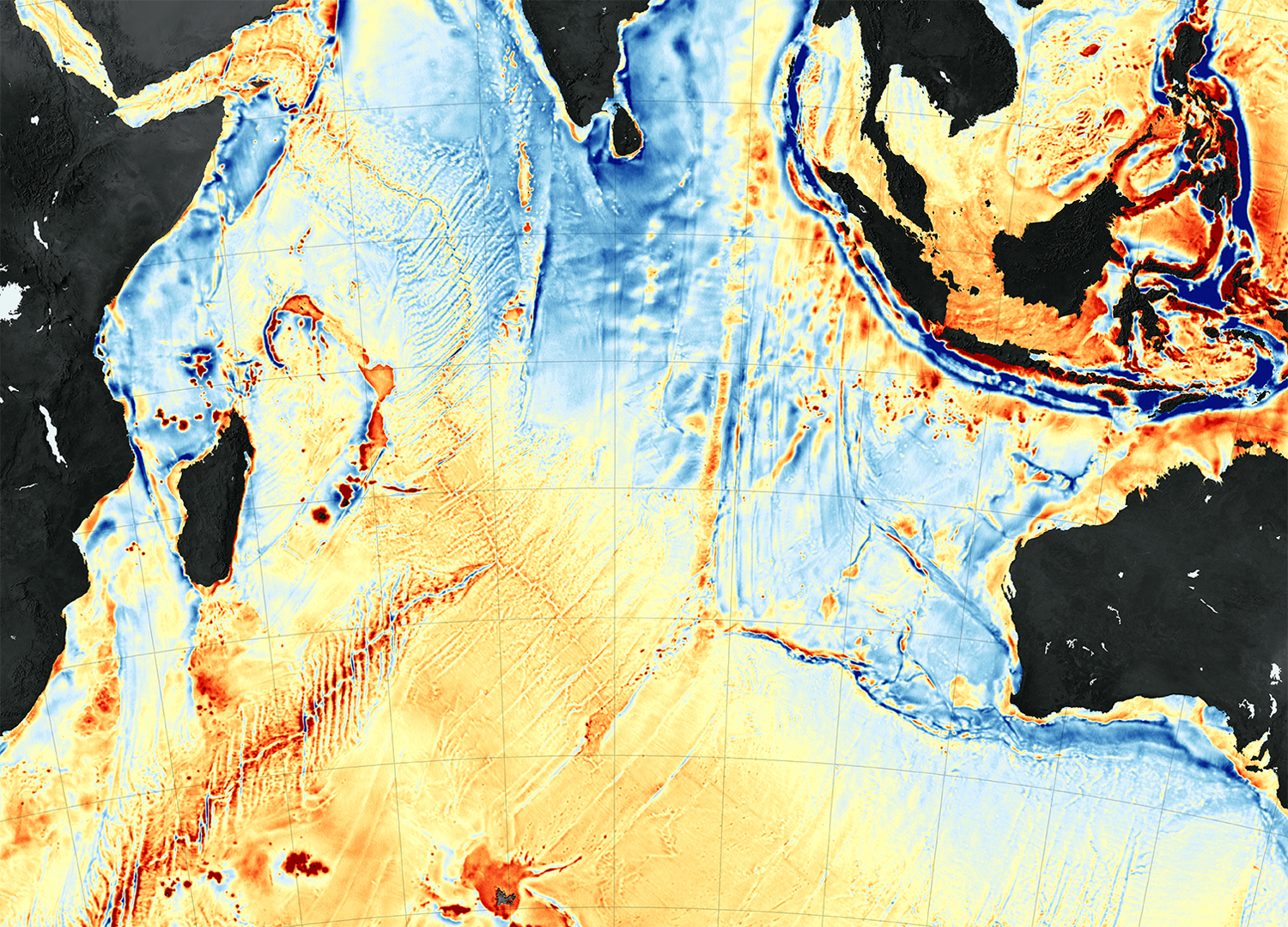
Ocean floor gravity features associated with Kerguelen hotspot. Mouseover is enabled.

The oldest volcanic rocks assigned to the Kerguelen hotspot are now understood to have been erupted during the Early Cretaceous in the Comei large igneous province of southeastern Tibet from 145 million years ago. There is an overlap in time with the basalts in this area of Tibet whose youngest rocks at 130 million years ago with those found thousands of miles away at Bunbury, Western Australia which are up to 137 million years ago old but some are as young as 123 million years ago. Previous work had suggested maximum ages at Bunbury at 132.2 ± 0.3 million years ago. Both are relatively small volume volcanism compared to later developments. The continental breakup of India and Antarctica occurred around 132 to 130 million years ago.

Between Western Australia and Gulden Draak Knoll on the floor of the Indian Ocean are the Naturaliste, Wallaby, and Zenith Plateaus that erupted between 130 to 117 million years ago, now well separated from India. The Seaward Dipping Reflectors, now at the southern end of the Kerguelen Plateau near Antarctica also formed in this period more than 126 million years ago.

The Southern Kerguelen Plateau in the enlarging basin of the Indian Ocean was formed between 120 to 110 million years ago, and was a much larger volume of basalt, consistent with a large igneous province. In the meantime the Kerguelen mantle plume also erupted south of the Comei province the two traps of north east India, being the Rajmahal Traps and the Sylhet Traps. These erupted during a period between 118.1 ± 0.3 million years ago, and 115 million years ago. Eruptions also occurred during this period at what is now the Gulden Draak Knoll off Western Australia at 117 million years ago due to the subsequent tectonic plate motions. A best fit tectonic model explains these events by about 115 million years ago a mantle plume head reaching the surface underneath the forming Indian Ocean between India and Antarctica with extensive melting of thin oceanic crust of both plates.

The Central Kerguelen Plateau was formed between 110 to 100 million years ago by basalt eruption from the hotspot on a fast-moving Antarctic Plate, with the Elan Bank emplacement in the first 5 million years of this period.

At about 105 million years ago the triple junction of the Indian, Australian, and Antarctic plates crosses the plume so crust forms on three different plates at the same time. Matters now get complex with the latest evidence, because it appears the plume may be under the Australian Plate between 95 to 45 million years ago odd, creating the Broken Ridge for example at 95 to 94 million years ago, rather than continuing to be located at the triple junction as in classic tectonic models. Part of the plume had long believed to be erupting under the Indian Plate as it raced north contributing to the linear feature and ages of the basalts of the Ninety East Ridge with the oldest at the north, 82 million years ago and the youngest at its south, 37 million years ago. However there is good evidence in the form of magnetic measurements to each side of the ridge, that decompression melting along the Ninety East Ridge occurred as well, and the most recent model assigns a prominent role to this. The previous hot spot only hypothesis explained all features by the plume splitting with two effective hot spots. Multiple workers postulate that buried under about 5 km (3.1 mi) of sediments on the seafloor of the Bay of Bengal, there is a continuation of the Ninety East Ridge with volcanics deposited about 90 million years ago.

The opening of the Southeast Indian Ridge at 40 million years ago resulted in the creation by the hot spot of the Northern Kerguelen Plateau on the Antarctic plate, and also explains 20 million years ago age of the Chain of the Dead Poets that connects the ends of the Ninety East Ridge and the Broken Ridge to the northern aspect of the Southeast Indian Ridge. This also could explain the more recent formation of the Amsterdam-Saint Paul Plateau, which is aged at 10 million years ago and is to the south of present Southeast Indian Ridge, but composition studies are inconsistent. It is possible that these eruptives come from a second hot spot, and most recent authorities agree.

The hot spot is now under the southern Central Kerguelen Plateau again, explaining the recent volcanic activity already commented upon.

=== Composition ===
There is a trend in Kerguelen plume magmatism, from tholeiitic/transitional basalts in those more than 25 million years ago to alkalic basalts. Seamounts dredged between the Kerguelen Islands and Heard Island were formed in the Miocene by mildly alkalic, olivine and picrite basalt. The composition at and near Amsterdam and Saint Paul Island are distinct from other Kerguelen plume material.

The Ninety East Ridge has tholeiite basalt typical of Indian Ocean basalts with no systematic isotopic variation observed along the ridge and this is inconsistent with the hypothesis of an ageing mantle plume origin for all of the ridge.. However at least three distinct sources must have contributed to the basalts of the ridge. The isotopic composition is intermediate between those of the basalts found at or near the Kerguelen and Amsterdam-Saint Paul plateaus.. This results in the interpretation that the Kerguelen hotspot as described by some, is at least two separate hotspots, and the Ninety East Ridge is predominantly a historic divergent plate boundary with eruptives from a deep mantle source. One sample from Boomerang Seamount, a volcano of the Amsterdam-Saint Paul Plateau, has a composition that is midway between St Paul Island and Kerguelen Plateau samples and this is consistent with Kerguelen-type source mantle existing beneath the Amsterdam-Saint Paul Plateau.
