= Southeast Indian Ridge =

Mid-ocean ridge in the southern Indian Ocean

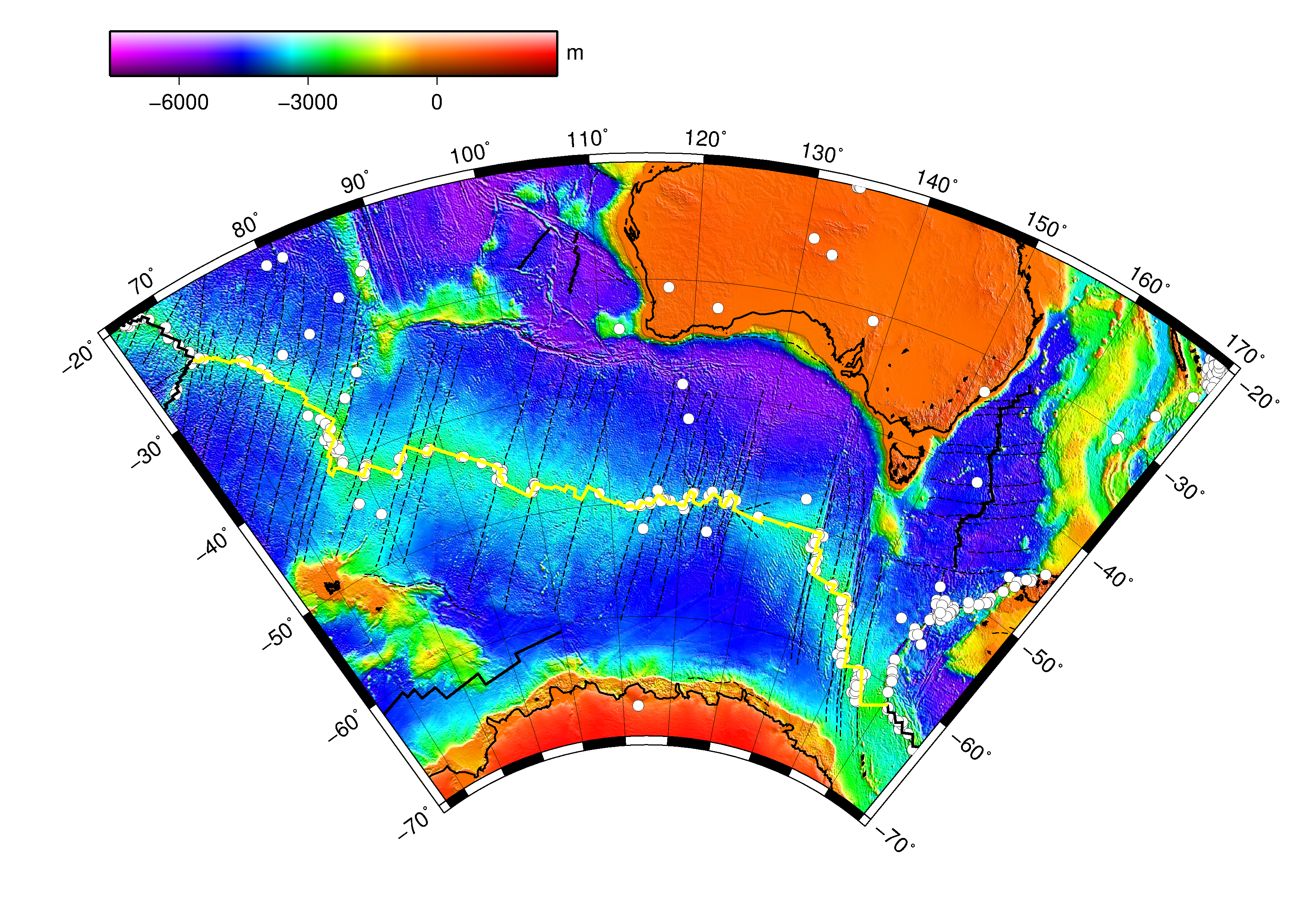
The Southeast Indian Ridge (denoted by the yellow line)

The Southeast Indian Ridge (SEIR) is a mid-ocean ridge in the southern Indian Ocean. A divergent tectonic plate boundary stretching almost 6,000 km (3,700 mi) between the Rodrigues triple junction (25°S 70°E) in the Indian Ocean and the Macquarie triple junction (63°S 165°E) in the Pacific Ocean, the SEIR forms the plate boundary between the Australian and Antarctic plates since the Oligocene (anomaly 13).

The SEIR is the spreading centre closest to the Kerguelen and Amsterdam–Saint-Paul hotspots. The SEIR has an intermediate full spreading rate of 65 mm/a (2.6 in/year), and, because Antarctica is virtually stationary, this results in a northward ridge migration of half that rate. Spreading rates along the SEIR varies from 69 mm/a (2.7 in/year) near 88°E to 75 mm/a (3.0 in/year) near 120°E.

Approximate surface projections that illustrate Amsterdam Saint Paul hotspot with the mantle Bouguer abnormality mapped in red shading to indicate the likely current plume location.'"`UNIQ--ref-00000006-QINU`"' Also shown is the approximate outline of the Amsterdam Saint Paul Plateau (brown), the Boomerang Seamount (blue), nearby subsurface transform faults (grey), fracture zones (orange), their probable extensions (light orange) and plate boundary (white) as referred to in text of article.'"`UNIQ--ref-00000007-QINU`"' Clicking on the map to enlarge it enables mouse over of feature names.

== Geology ==
=== Amsterdam−St. Paul hotspot ===
During the past few million years hotspot activity has produced a 150 km × 200 km (93 mi × 124 mi) plateau straddling on the SEIR. This Amsterdam–St. Paul Plateau while formed in the last 10 million years, started this formation beneath the Australian Plate so the plateau is now built on the components of two tectonic plates (see Kumar et al. for diagram of this complex process). For several reasons, including that the composition at and near Amsterdam and Saint Paul Island is distinct from other Kerguelen hotspot material, this has suggested to many that the Amsterdam–St. Paul hotspot (ASP) is separate from the Kerguelen hotspot. The ASP Plateau covers an area of 30,000 km^{2} (12,000 sq mi) and rises 500 m (1,600 ft) above the surrounding seafloor.

Both Amsterdam and St. Paul are located on the Antarctic Plate side within 40 km (25 mi) of the SEIR. North-east of the ASP Plateau a string of submarine volcanoes, the Chain of the Dead Poets, 1–3 km (0.62–1.86 mi)-high and 40 km (25 mi)-wide, mark the track of the ASP hotspot across the Australian Plate. This track leads to the intersection of the Broken Ridge and Ninety East Ridge west of Australia. The ASP hotspot ceased to produce these volcanoes some 10 to 5 million years ago when the SEIR started to interact with it and the hotspot started to build the shallow plateau. There is an active submarine volcano, the 1,100 m (3,600 ft)-high Boomerang Seamount, 18 km (11 mi) north of Amsterdam Island near the SEIR. Analyses of the isotope composition of basalts recovered from its caldera support that the ASP hotspot contributed to the formation of the southern Ninety East Ridge.

=== Kerguelen hotspot ===
The Kerguelen plume is likely to have played a role in the breakup of eastern Gondwana about 136 Ma and be relevant to the formation of the SEIR later but this relevance is still not fully understood.

The Kerguelen hotspot, located more than 1,000 km (620 mi) from the SEIR currently, also influences the MORB composition of the SEIR near the ASP Plateau. About 43 to 40 Ma ago, Broken Ridge to the north and the Kerguelen plateau to its far south were adjacent, having been formed by the Kerguelen hotspot and the propagation of the SEIR rift fracture has separated them. Many recent authors do not try to portray a continuous connection between Broken Ridge which has Kerguele plume basalts formed 37 Ma ago and the Kerguelen plateau basalts formed between 37 Ma and now for several reasons, including that the ocean floor south of the ASP Plateau and north of the Kerguele Plateau is poorly studied.

=== Australian−Antarctic Discordance ===
Trending east-west between Australia and Antarctica, the SEIR traverses the Australian-Antarctic Discordance (AAD), a morphologically complex region overlying an area of mantle down-welling. Located midway between the ASP-Kerguelen and the Balleny-Tasmantid hotspots, the AAD overlies a region where cooler mantle temperatures have produced a thin oceanic crust and a rough topography with deep valleys. The AAD is found between 120° and 128° E and covers about 500 km (310 mi) of the SEIR which at this point is deep mid-ocean ridge at between 4,000–4,500 m (13,100–14,800 ft) in the centre of the Australian–Antarctic depression.

Between the AAD and the Amsterdam and St. Paul islands, spreading rate is constant at 69–75 mm/a (2.7–3.0 in/year) while axial depth increases by more than 2,300 m (7,500 ft). This has been interpreted as an eastward decrease in mantle temperature of perhaps 100 °C (212 °F) caused by a magma flow from the Kerguelen–ASP hotspots to the AAD 'cold spot' at 120–128°E. Located at 126°E, the AAD would thus mark the 40 km (25 mi)-long transition between Indian Ocean and Pacific MORBs (mid-ocean ridge basalts), a boundary that has been migrating westward during the past tens of million years.

Between 102°E and the AAD, where the spreading rate is constant, the left-stepping transform faults suggest the presence of oblique extensional forces while the presence of a long, elevated ridge near the 96°E right-stepping transform suggests a compressional force is also active. Together these features indicate the two tectonic plate made a recent counter-clockwise change in relative motion.

Between 88°E and 118°E there are nine transform faults offsetting the SEIR 21–135 km (13–84 mi) of an age of 3.6 to 0.5 million years ago, accompanied by eight first-order segments (older than 5 million years ago) and five east-migrating rifts. These transform faults and migrating rifts are located were the SEIR reaches its maximum axial depths. The first-order transform faults are off-set 2–17 km (1.2–10.6 mi) by 19 non-transform discontinuities, resulting in 18–180 km (11–112 mi)-long second-order segments. The flanks of the SEIR are dominated by fracture zones perpendicular to the ridge and gravitational lineations oblique to the spreading direction and sometimes zigzag-shaped. This suggests that the SEIR evolves rapidly within the framework of the stable transform faults.

== Tectonic history ==
Australia and Antarctica were neighbours before the break-up of Gondwana in the Cretaceous and several conjugate structures exist on either side of the SEIR. In south-western Australia the Albany-Fraser Orogen formed during the Mesoproterozoic collision between the Australian Yilgarn and Antarctic Mawson cratons. The continental basement of the submarine Naturaliste Plateau is also associated with this orogeny. The Darling Fault on the Australian west coast has a possible continuation beneath the Antarctic Denman Glacier. Archaean and Paleoproterzoic rocks in the Kalinjala Mylonite Zone of the Eyre Peninsula, Australia, match those found in Terre Adelie in Eastern Wilkes Land, Antarctica. Faults in Tasmania–Victoria and Northern Victoria Land have been identified as Cambrian remains of the west-dipping subduction zone along the eastern margin of Gondwana.

Australia and Antarctica broke-up around 110 million years ago but spreading in the SEIR first began during the Eocene (40 million years ago) when the Kerguelen hotspot separated Broken Ridge from the rest of the Kerguelen Plateau. The SEIR has been migrating northeast since and is now located 1,400 km (870 mi) from the Kerguelen hotspot. The ASP hotspot was originally located beneath Australia and a chain of seamounts connecting it to the southern end of the Ninety East Ridge, i.e. the ASP hotspot track, indicate it probably contributed to the formation of the Ninety East Ridge before the SEIR opened.

The opening of the Southern Ocean began west of Australia around 100 million years ago from where it propagated eastward at about 2 cm/year (0.79 in/year). This rifting was not the direct product of hotspot interaction as it occurred over a cooler than normal mantle. Initially spreading was extremely slow, a half rate of 2–6 mm/a (0.079–0.236 in/year) during the period 96 to 45 million years ago after which it accelerated to 30–35 mm/a (1.2–1.4 in/year).

== Oceanography ==
The SEIR divides the channel between Australia and Antarctica into the South Indian Basin to the south and the South Australian and Tasman basins to the north. The AAD forms a saddle across the channel while also offering the deepest connection between the Australian and South Indian basins.

There is a voluminous contourite drift along the southern flank of SEIR. Volcanic in origin, it is most likely derived from the slopes of the Kerguelen Plateau and Crozet Islands. This redistribution of sediments has occurred during the last 40000 years. Elevated contributions during the Last Glacial Maximum are thought to be caused by the Antarctic Circumpolar Current and Circumpolar Deep Water and their interaction with the Circumpolar Bottom Water.

== See also ==
- Central Indian Ridge
- Southwest Indian Ridge
- Rodrigues triple junction
