= Wharton Basin =

Marine area of the northeast quarter of the Indian Ocean

Coordinates: 27°S 103°E

Wharton Basin

Wharton Basin is the marine area of the north east quarter of the Indian Ocean. It is named after William Wharton (1843–1905), Hydrographer of the Navy. Alternative names are Cocos Basin (after the Cocos Islands) and West Australian Basin.

It lies east of the Ninety East Ridge and west of Western Australia.

It is of interest in relation to Indian Ocean floor movement and adjacent fracture zones and the relationship between the Indian and Australian plates and is one of a number of features of the Indian Ocean that has been studied extensively.
