= Ninety East Ridge =

Linear ridge on the Indian Ocean floor near the 90th meridian

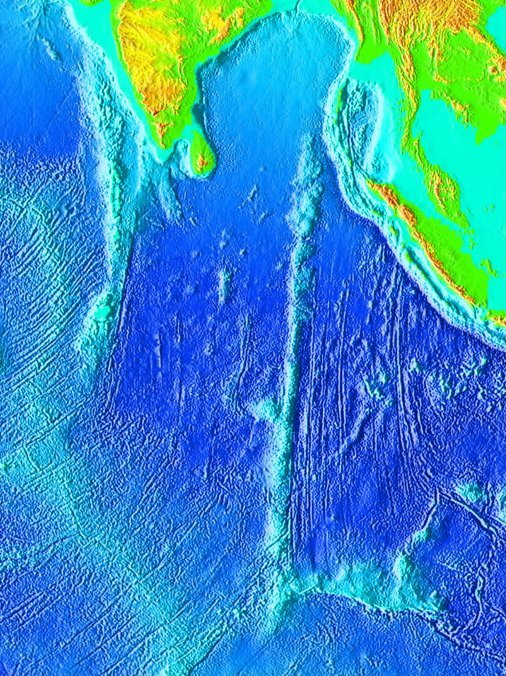
The Ninety East Ridge at the centre of the picture and the Chagos-Laccadive Ridge on the upper left side

The Ninety East Ridge (also rendered as Ninetyeast Ridge, 90E Ridge or 90°E Ridge) is a linear intraplate rise on the Indian Ocean floor, named for its near-parallel strike along the 90th meridian at the center of the Eastern Hemisphere. It is approximately 5,000 kilometres (3,100 mi) in length and can be traced topographically from the Bay of Bengal southward towards the Southeast Indian Ridge (SEIR), though the feature continues to the north where it is hidden beneath the sediments of the Bengal Fan. The ridge extends between latitudes 31°S and 9°N and has an average width of 200 km (120 mi).

== Description ==
The ridge divides the Indian Ocean into the West and East Indian Ocean. The northeastern side is named the Wharton Basin and ceases at the western end of the Diamantina fracture zone which passes to the east and almost to the Australian continent.

The ridge is primarily composed of ocean island tholeiites (OIT), a subset of basalt which were shown to increase in age from approximately 43.2 ± 0.5 million years ago in the south to 81.8 ± 2.6 million years ago in the north. A more recent analysis using modern Ar–Ar techniques gives an age progression from 77 million years ago at 5°N to 43 million years ago at 31°S. Even more recent work with more samples gives a range of 82 to 37 million years agoThis age progression has led geologists to theorize that a hotspot in the mantle beneath the Indo-Australian plate created the ridge as the plate has moved northward in the late Mesozoic and Cenozoic. This theory was supported by analysis of the chemistry of the Kerguelen Plateau and Rajmahal Traps, which were believed to represent the flood basalts erupted at the initiation of volcanism at the Kerguelen hotspot which was then sheared in two as the Indian subcontinent moved northward. However the area of the Ninety East Ridge as well as being related to the hotspot was noted to be part of the diffuse boundary between the Indian plate and Australian plate. This has led to modifications of understanding. Some maintain close to the original view. The Ninety East Ridge has no systematic isotopic variation observed along the ridge and this is inconsistent with the hypothesis of an ageing mantle plume origin for all of the ridge. At least three distinct sources must have contributed to the basalts of the ridge. This results in the interpretation that at least two separate hotspots contributed and the Ninety East Ridge is predominantly a historic divergent plate boundary with eruptives from a deep mantle source.

=== Surveying ===
The ridge has been surveyed several times in the past, including several times by the Deep Sea Drilling Program (DSDP). In 2007, the RV Roger Revelle collected bathymetric, magnetic and seismic data together with dredge samples from nine sites along the ridge as part of an Integrated Ocean Drilling Program (IODP) site survey intended to examine the hotspot hypothesis for the ridge.

== Origins ==
It had been assumed that India and Australia were on a single tectonic plate for at least the last 32 million years. However, considering the high level of large earthquakes in the Ninety East Ridge area and the evidence of deformation in the central Indian Ocean, it is more appropriate to consider the deformed region in the central Indian Ocean as a broad plate boundary zone separating the Indian plate and the Australian plate.

== Paleontology ==
During the late Paleocene around 60 million years ago, parts of the Ninety East Ridge were temporarily exposed for 2–3 million years as volcanic islands probably 1,000 km (600 mi) from the nearest land. Preserved pollen and plant cuticle fragments have been found in boreholes drilled on the ridge. The flora has been noted to be most similar to Australian and Antarctic floras, rather than to Indian floras, including Podocarpaceae conifers, as well as 15 species of angiosperms, including members of Arecaceae, Chloranthaceae sensu lato, Lauraceae, Gunnera, Gillbeea, and possibly Callitrichaceae.

== See also ==
- Aseismic ridge
- Eighty Five East Ridge
