= Rajmahal Traps =

Indian volcanic igneous province

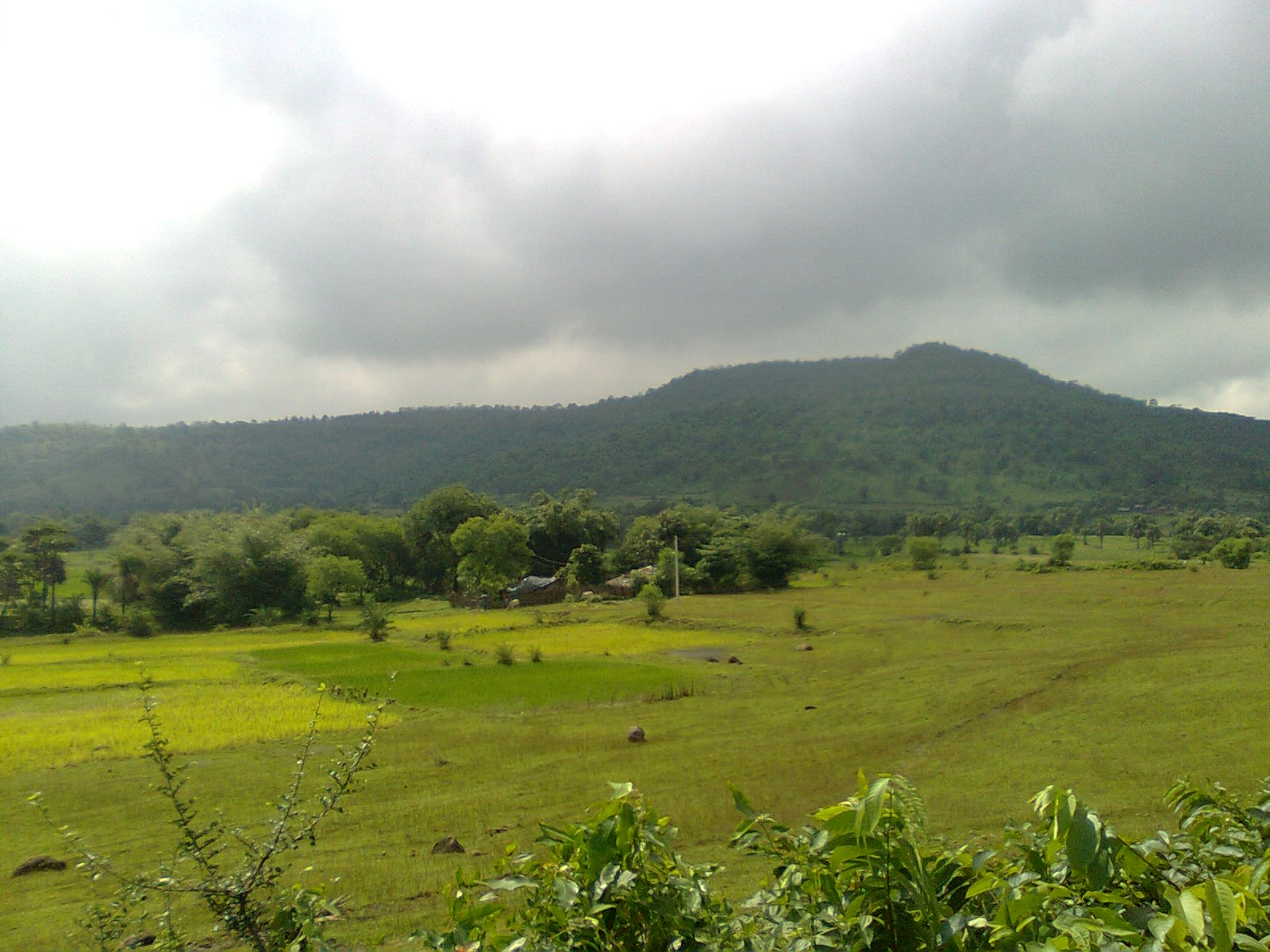
View of Rajmahal Hills

The Rajmahal Traps is a volcanic igneous province in Eastern India, covering the parts of Jharkhand, West Bengal and Meghalaya. The Rajmahal Hills of Jharkhand is the type area of this province. Multiple layers of solidified lava made the 608-metre-thick (1,995 ft) Rajmahal Traps which are dipping 2–5° towards the north-east. Individual layers vary in thickness from less than one metre (3 ft 3 in) to more than 70 metres (230 ft).

== Genesis ==
These volcanic rocks were formed from the eruptions over the Kerguelen hotspot in the early Cretaceous. The similarity between the geochemical data of Rajmahal volcanos and lavas of the Kerguelen Plateau confirms this. According to plate tectonics, the Indian subcontinent was over this hot spot during the Cretaceous Period.

The original lava flow covered an area of nearly 4,100 km^{2} (1,600 sq mi). Below the Bengal basin the flows cover 200,000 km^{2} (77,000 sq mi).

== Lithology ==
The Rajmahal volcanics are predominantly tholeiitic basalt, quartz tholeiite, olivine tholeiite and alkali basalt. The Intertrappean Beds are composed of sedimentary rock such as siltstone, claystone and shale.

== Structural evolution ==
The western boundary of the Rajmahal Traps is faulted and down-thrown towards the east. The eastern boundary of this trap has a North-South trending, fault-controlled basement. This basement connects the Purnea basin of the Ganga valley with the Bengal basin. These faulted contacts, along with the Damodar Gondwana graben, form a triple junction at the mouth of the Bengal basin. The traps evolved along the then eastern continental margin of India, following rifting of Gondwanaland. Over the epochs, the upper part of the lava deformed in a cold, brittle fashion and formed graben structures.

== Fossils ==
The Intertrappean Beds contain an assemblage of Lower Cretaceous plant fossils. The assemblage includes Cladophlebis indica, Dictyozamites indicus, Taeniopteris spatulata, and Brachyphyllum rhombium.

== See also ==
- Deccan Traps
- Rajmahal
