= Naturaliste Plateau =

Submarine plateau in Indian Ocean

Coordinates: 34.1°S 111.3°E

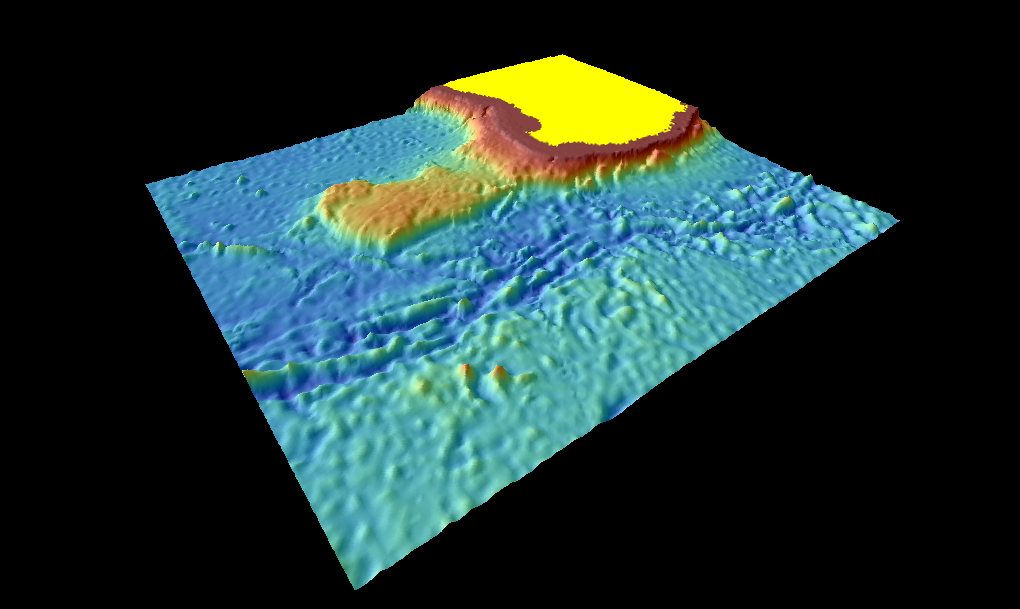
Naturaliste Plateau

The Naturaliste Plateau is one of several large submarine plateaus extending from Western Australia into the Indian Ocean. It is a rectilinear plateau that covers an area of 90,000 square kilometres. Its width is about 400 kilometres (250 mi) east-west and 250 km (160 mi) north-south. The water depths are from 1500 to 5000 metres.

The Mentelle Basin and Naturaliste Trough lie between the mainland and this plateau. The plateau is bordered by the Perth Abyssal Plain in the north and west and the Australian–Antarctic Basin in the south.

It is located within the Australian marine park known as the South-west Corner Marine Park.

The Naturaliste Plateau formed during the Early Cretaceous 136 Ma when Australia and India broke up and during the Late Cretaceous 83 Ma when Australia and Antarctica broke up. Lavas and intrusive rocks on the plateau flanks have ages of between 132 and 128 Ma. The volcanic sequence that consists of alternating basaltic flows and volcaniclastic beds, cut by multiple dikes, was recovered at IODP Site U1513 on the eastern flank. After the volcanic eruption, the Naturaliste Plateau subsided from shelf to bathyal depths during the Early Cretaceous. The eastern flank of the plateau slopes relatively gently, while the other three flanks are relatively steep. The southern flank formed during the Australia-Antarctica break-up, the other flanks during the rifting between India and Australia. The continent ocean transition (COT) is 30–90 km (19–56 mi) wide on the north side and 250 km (160 mi) on the southern side where the plateau is flanked by the Diamantina fracture zone.

Before India broke off from Australia-Antarctica at 127 Ma, the Naturaliste Plateau was flanked by what would become two microcontinents: the Batavia and Gulden Draak Knolls, which are now located on the western margin of the Perth Abyssal Plain 1,600 km (990 mi) from Australia. South of the plateau, during some 45 Ma after India and the two knolls broke off, rifting occurred between the plateau and the Bruce Rise, now located off Antarctica. This rifting continued until sea-floor spreading began 83 Ma.

Continental metamorphic and granitic basement rocks have been dredged from both knolls. Protolith granite from Gulden Draak was emplaced in either the Australian Yilgarn craton or the Antarctic Mawson Craton 2850 Ma. The Mesoproterozoic crust from this knoll is coeval with crust from the Naturaliste Plateau. Neoproterozoic-Cambrian (540–530 Ma) granite gneisses from the Batavia Knoll were emplaced during or after the formation of the Kuunga Orogen.
